= Kathleen I. Pritchard =

Canadian oncologist

- Education: Queen's University
- Occupations: Medical oncologist Clinical trials research scientist
- Awards: O. Harold Warwick Prize

Kathleen I. Pritchard, CM is the head of oncology at Sunnybrook Health Sciences Centre in Toronto, Canada, specializing in breast cancer therapies, and leading the clinical trials division of the centre. She has authored numerous studies on women's health, breast cancer, hormone replacement therapy, public health, and research methodology. According to Thomson Reuters, Pritchard was one of the most cited researchers in the world in 2014 and 2015.

== Biography ==
Kathleen I. Pritchard, CM, grew up in Deep River, Ontario. She graduated from the local high school in 1964. She earned her Bachelor's in Science in 1968 from Queen's University in Kingston, Ontario and attained her medical degree there in 1971. Her practicum in Internal Medicine was completed at Wellesley Hospital, Toronto Western Hospital, and Toronto General Hospital. Between 1973 and 1974 at the University of Toronto, Pritchard focused on research into melanoma and tumor immunology, and then in 1977 began researching breast cancer in clinical trials as a research fellow at the University of Toronto.

Between 1978 and 1984, Pritchard conducted clinical trials at Women's College Hospital under an award granted by the National Cancer Institute of Canada (NCIC). In 1984, she was appointed head of Medical Oncology and Haematology at Women's College Hospital and chair of the Breast Cancer Site Group of the NCIC. Three years later, Pritchard moved to the Sunnybrook Regional Cancer Centre in Toronto where she has served as head of Medical Oncology. A decade later, in 1997, she was appointed to head the Clinical Trials and Epidemiology at the Odette Cancer Centre of Sunnybrook. She has been involved in numerous studies and is one of Canada's most-known academic physicians, researching such topics as chemotherapy verses hormone therapy, the effects of aging and menopause for risk of breast cancer, and drugs which aid in non-recurrence.

== Research ==
Pritchard is an oncologist and researcher with involvement in numerous clinical studies. Her research spans a range of topics, but it focuses primarily on women's health and breast cancer therapies. Her research goals include the development of individualized patient therapies and the advancement of prognostic tests. Some of her research investigates the use of genetic factors to predict disease progression and to formulate tailored treatment plans. In addition to looking at genetics, Pritchard's research aims to better understand primary and secondary combination treatments, taking into account the patient's age and stage in life. Pritchard's clinical trials have yielded findings that have transformed breast cancer treatment approaches worldwide. Pritchard is published in numerous significant journals of oncology, including The New England Journal of Medicine, Journal of the National Cancer Institute, Journal of Clinical Oncology, The Lancet, and The Lancet Oncology.

One of Pritchard's self-proclaimed "eureka" moments was in a clinical trial concerning the use of the drug letrozole as an adjuvant therapy in postmenopausal women who had taken tamoxifen for five years as a primary breast cancer treatment. Letrozole is an aromatase inhibitor that reduces estrogen production, which is necessary for tumor growth. Pritchard followed over 5,000 postmenopausal women who had taken tamoxifen for their breast cancer and treated them with either letrozole or a placebo. Letrozole treatment reduced the risk of breast cancer recurrence by over 40%. The study ended early because of overwhelmingly positive results. The drug also prevented metastasis of the cancer to other regions of the body. Results from this clinical study were published in The New England Journal of Medicine in 2003, and two years later the therapy was approved by Health Canada. Later studies suggested that extending treatment with an aromatase inhibitor like letrozole to ten years further increases disease-free survival rates. Another study looked at the effects of adjuvant therapies like letrozole in women of different ages, both premenopausal and postmenopausal. Pritchard found that letrozole favorably impacted women in both groups but was overall more effective in premenopausal women who had been previously treated with tamoxifen. The overarching conclusion from this study was that anti-estrogen treatments like letrozole generally benefit patients when administered any time after the primary treatment.

Pritchard has postulated that women with breast cancer and high levels of the HER-2/neu protein are predisposed to respond more favorably to anthracycline-containing chemotherapy drugs than women with normal HER-2/neu levels. The target of anthracycline drugs is topoisomerase II, and its location in regards to the HER-2 gene on the chromosome is what allows the anthracycline drug to be effective in patients with heavy expression of the HER-2/neu protein. Pritchard demonstrated that women with high levels of HER-2 expression have a better response to the anthracycline containing drugs in a clinical trial. Pritchard's research suggests that the HER-2 gene could be useful as a possible predictor of the adjuvant therapy that is most effective in certain patients. Her study demonstrated ways in which chemotherapy can be tailored to the specific patient. The goal of such tailored therapy is that patients can be spared the toxicity and side effects of drugs that they do not actually need.

Some of Pritchard's most recent research has to do with endocrine therapy combination strategies for the treatment of HR1/HER2–advanced breast cancer in postmenopausal women. The best sequencing for endocrine therapy combination treatment has yet to be determined, but much evidence supports that some combinations help with first-line defense and other combinations work as second-line defense. First-line therapy for advanced breast cancer patients could either be a combination of fulvestrant and anastrozole or palbociclib and letrozole. Combinations of everolimus and exemestane or palbociclib plus fulvestrant are good second-line therapies. With second-line therapy combinations there are some risks for toxicity, which can be controlled by early and regular monitoring.

Pritchard also collaborated on a study that looked at different irradiation approaches as primary therapies for early stage breast cancer patients. Pritchard looked at the outcomes of whole breast irradiation with or without additional nodal irradiation in early-stage breast cancer patients. Patients were either given whole breast irradiation or whole breast irradiation with additional nodal irradiation. The researchers followed up with patients after ten years. There was no significant difference in the rate of survival between the two treatment groups. However, the group treated with additional nodal irradiation did have a lower incidence of recurring breast cancer.

Recent research explores Oncotype DX as a prognostic tool in predicting the likelihood of breast cancer recurrence. Oncotype DX is a genetic recurrence-scoring tool that measures expression of certain genes associated with breast cancer. A higher score indicates a higher chance of recurring cancer. One project, the TAILORx study, uses the Oncotype DX score to gauge the need for adjuvant therapy and to predict the response to such adjuvant chemotherapy treatments. Pritchard was able to confirm Oncotype DX as a useful tool in deciding upon treatment for low-scoring patients. Current results are inconclusive as to Oncotype DX's predictive ability for middle-scoring patients.

Pritchard also explored the effects of hormone replacement therapy (HRT) on women and the potential for developing breast cancer. HRT is usually given to women who are estrogen deficient or menopausal women to lessen their symptoms of menopause. Through her studies of long-term HRT effects, Pritchard discovered there is a 53% higher risk for women developing cancer with a HRT combination of progesterone and estrogen, but only a 34% higher risk in women who just receive estrogen. Other risks include its cardiovascular effects, such as blood clotting, and dense breast tissue, which makes it harder to read a mammogram. Pritchard suggests alternatives to combat estrogen deficiency and menopausal symptoms. Alternatives include Vitamin E, calcium supplements, venlafaxine, clonidine, and diet. She concludes that it may not be as effective, but it does not have the increased risk for breast cancer.

== Memberships ==
Pritchard was a founding member of the Canadian Oncology Society in 1978 and a founding member of the Canadian Association of Medical Oncology in 1988, serving as its president from 1990 to 1992. She served as chair and co-chair of the Ontario Practice Guidelines Initiative's Breast Cancer Site Group between 1990 and 2002. She served on the board of directors for the American Society of Clinical Oncology in 2006.

== Awards and honors ==
In 2005, Pritchard was awarded the O. Harold Warwick Prize by the Canadian Cancer Society for her clinical trials work on breast cancer. In 2015, she was the Scientific Honoree at the 14th Women of Action awards luncheon hosted by the Israel Cancer Research Fund in Toronto. In December 2017, it was announced that Dr. Pritchard has been honoured as a Member of the Order of Canada (CM).

== Selected publications ==
- Pritchard, Kathleen I. (1978). "Tamoxifen and Metastatic Breast Cancer". Annals of Internal Medicine. 89 (5): 721–722. doi:10.7326/0003-4819-89-5-721_2.
- Pritchard, Kathleen I. (February 1989). "Screening for Endometrial Cancer: Is It Effective?". Annals of Internal Medicine. 110 (3): 177–9. doi:10.7326/0003-4819-110-3-177. PMID 2912359.
- Pritchard, Kathleen I. (July 1989). "Systemic Adjuvant Therapy for Node-Negative Breast Cancer: Proven or Premature?". Annals of Internal Medicine. 111 (1): 1–4. doi:10.7326/0003-4819-111-1-1. PMID 2660644.
- Therapeutic advantages of droloxifene, a new antiestrogen, in breast cancer : proceedings of the Satellite Symposium "Droloxifene, a New Antiestrogen with Therapeutic Advantages" (Report). Hamburg: 15th International Cancer Congress. 18 August 1990. (with Henri Rochefort)
- Pritchard, Kathleen I. (August 1994). "Clinical cooperative trials of the national cancer institute of Canada clinical trials group breast cancer site group". Cancer. 74 (S3): 1150–1155. doi:10.1002/1097-0142(19940801)74:3+<1150::AID-CNCR2820741525>3.0.CO;2-5. PMID 8039151. S2CID 1517717.
- Pritchard, Kathleen I. (July 1998). "Is tamoxifen effective in prevention of breast cancer?". The Lancet. 352 (9122): 80–81. doi:10.1016/S0140-6736(98)85002-2. PMID 9672266. S2CID 38400559.
- Pritchard, Kathleen I. (June 2000). "Current and future directions in medical therapy for breast carcinoma". Cancer. 88 (S12): 3065–3072. doi:10.1002/1097-0142(20000615)88:12+<3065::AID-CNCR25>3.0.CO;2-P. PMID 10898353. S2CID 23844171.
- "Endocrine Therapy of Advanced Disease: Analysis and Implications of the Existing Data". Clinical Cancer Research. 9 (1): 460S. 2003.
- Pritchard, K. (December 2005). "Adjuvant endocrine therapies for pre-/perimenopausal women". The Breast. 14 (6): 547–554. doi:10.1016/S0960-9776(05)80024-4. PMID 16274993.
- Pritchard, Kathleen I. (July 2007). "Risk of chemotherapy induced menopause: More detailed data will lead to improved quality of life". European Journal of Cancer. 43 (11): 1644–1645. doi:10.1016/j.ejca.2007.05.027. PMID 17596929.
- Pritchard, Kathleen I. (June 2008). "Antihormone Therapy in Recurrent Metastatic Breast Cancer". JAMA: The Journal of the American Medical Association. 299 (23): 2745. doi:10.1001/jama.299.23.2745-a. PMID 18559999.
- Pritchard, Kathleen I. (December 2010). "Do selective serotonin receptor inhibitor antidepressants reduce tamoxifen's effectiveness and increase the risk of death from breast cancer?". Breast Cancer Research. 12 (4) S18. doi:10.1186/bcr2747. PMC 3005738. PMID 21172080.
