= Vorozole =

Chemical compound

Clinical data
- Other names: R-76713; Rizivor
- ATC code: L02BG05 (WHO)

Pharmacokinetic data
- Bioavailability: Very high
- Metabolism: Hepatic
- Elimination half-life: 8 hours

Identifiers
- IUPAC name: 6-[(4-Chlorophenyl)(1,2,4-triazol-1-yl)methyl]-1-methylbenzotriazole
- CAS Number: 129731-10-8
- PubChem CID: 6918191
- ChemSpider: 5293402
- UNII: 1E2S9YXV2A
- KEGG: D03786
- ChEMBL: ChEMBL224060
- CompTox Dashboard (EPA): DTXSID20156230

Chemical and physical data
- Formula: C_{16}H_{13}ClN_{6}
- Molar mass: 324.77 g·mol^{−1}
- 3D model (JSmol): Interactive image
- SMILES: Clc1ccc(cc1)[C@@H](c2ccc3nnn(c3c2)C)n4ncnc4

Vorozole (developmental code name R-76713; former tentative brand name Rizivor) is a triazole based competitive inhibitor of the aromatase enzyme. It underwent clinical testing for evaluation for use as an antineoplastic agent; however it was withdrawn from testing when no difference was detected in the duration of median survival as compared to the progestational agent megestrol acetate and research instead focused on the other third generation aromatase inhibitors anastrozole, letrozole and exemestane.
