= ATD =

ATD may refer to:

== Computing and technology ==
- Anthropomorphic test device, also known as a crash test dummy
- at (command) or @daemon (spelled "atd", lower case), standard Unix program
- Azimuth tractor drive, drive system for tugboats

== Medicine and science ==
- 1,4,6-Androstatrien-3,17-dione, estrogen inhibitor
- Acute tryptophan depletion
- Anti-thyroid drugs or antithyroid agent

== Other uses ==
- ATD Fourth World
- Against the Day, Thomas Pynchon novel
- Association for Talent Development, non-profit association
- Attention to Detail, defunct British video-game developer
- Postal code for Attard, Malta
