= 1,4,6-Androstatriene-3,17-dione =

Chemical compound

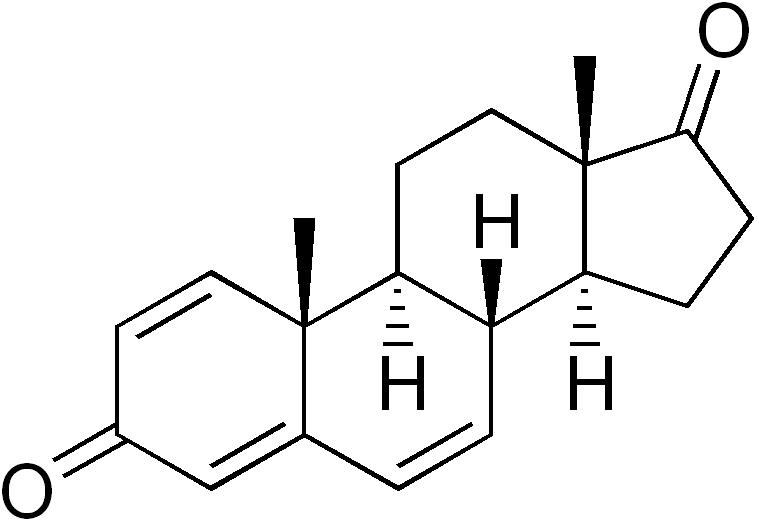

Clinical data
- Routes of administration: Oral

Legal status
- Legal status: US: Supplement

Pharmacokinetic data
- Metabolism: Hepatic
- Elimination half-life: 48 hours

Identifiers
- IUPAC name: (8R,9S,10R,13S,14S)-10,13-dimethyl-9,11,12,14,15,16-hexahydro-8H-cyclopenta[a]phenanthrene-3,17-dione
- CAS Number: 633-35-2
- PubChem CID: 104880
- ChemSpider: 94659
- UNII: 217A6T1V8N
- ChEBI: CHEBI:131190
- CompTox Dashboard (EPA): DTXSID60862328

Chemical and physical data
- Formula: C_{19}H_{22}O_{2}
- Molar mass: 282.383 g·mol^{−1}
- 3D model (JSmol): Interactive image
- SMILES: O=C\4\C=C/[C@]3(C(/C=C\[C@H]2[C@H]1[C@@](C(=O)CC1)(CC[C@@H]23)C)=C/4)C
- InChI: InChI=1S/C19H22O2/c1-18-9-7-13(20)11-12(18)3-4-14-15-5-6-17(21)19(15,2)10-8-16(14)18/h3-4,7,9,11,14-16H,5-6,8,10H2,1-2H3/t14-,15-,16-,18-,19-/m0/s1; Key:DKVSUQWCZQBWCP-QAGGRKNESA-N

1,4,6-Androstatriene-3,17-dione (ATD) is a potent irreversible aromatase inhibitor that inhibits estrogen biosynthesis by permanently binding and inactivating aromatase in adipose and peripheral tissue. It is used to control estrogen synthesis.

ATD was present in some over-the-counter bodybuilding supplements until 2009, as well as Topical ATD solutions that work transdermally. The product was developed and commercialized in the dietary supplement market place by industry journeyman Bruce Kneller, who holds a United States Patent for use of the compound and related compounds (#7,939,517) and Gaspari Nutrition. ATD has many names in sports supplements including: 1,4,6 etiollochan-dione, 3, 17-keto-etiochol-triene, androst-1,4,6-triene-3,17-dione and many others. These all refer to CAS# 633-35-2.

ATD may cause a positive test for the anabolic steroid Boldenone, of which it is a possible metabolite and production contaminant. ATD is also prohibited in amateur and professional sports which forbids aromatase inhibitors.

A related agent is exemestane (Aromasin).

== Synthesis ==
The synthesis of 1,4,6-Androstatriene-3,17-dione has been described: It is most congenially prepared from DHEA by oxidation with DDQ in a single step.

== Applications ==
- It is possible to use 1,4,6-Androstatriene-3,17-dione in the synthesis of estrone. However, the modern process seems to rely on Boldione.
- 1,4,6-Androstatriene-3,17-dione is used in the synthesis of 1-Methylestrone methyl ether, PC22295924. Birch reduction of this and work-up can lead to some interesting steroids with a 1-methyl group, although according to Dan the methyl group is in the beta-configuration. However, according to one patent, there is a scrambling of alpha/beta epimers and not a single isomer. Hence, this is the estrane equivalent of Demalon [2881-21-2] but a mixture of epimers.
