= Fadrozole =

Chemical compound

Clinical data
- Trade names: Afema
- Routes of administration: By mouth
- Drug class: Aromatase inhibitor; Antiestrogen
- ATC code: None

Legal status
- Legal status: In general: ℞ (Prescription only)

Identifiers
- IUPAC name: 4-(5,6,7,8-tetrahydroimidazo[1,5-a]pyridin-5-yl)benzonitrile
- CAS Number: 102676-47-1; hydrochloride: 102676-31-3
- PubChem CID: 59693
- ChemSpider: 53850
- UNII: H3988M64PU; hydrochloride: H0Q44H4ECQ
- KEGG: D02451
- ChEMBL: ChEMBL9298
- CompTox Dashboard (EPA): DTXSID5034141

Chemical and physical data
- Formula: C_{14}H_{13}N_{3}
- Molar mass: 223.279 g·mol^{−1}
- 3D model (JSmol): Interactive image
- SMILES: C1CC(N2C=NC=C2C1)C3=CC=C(C=C3)C#N
- InChI: InChI=1S/C14H13N3/c15-8-11-4-6-12(7-5-11)14-3-1-2-13-9-16-10-17(13)14/h4-7,9-10,14H,1-3H2; Key:CLPFFLWZZBQMAO-UHFFFAOYSA-N

Fadrozole (INN), sold under the brand name Afema (by Novartis), is a selective, nonsteroidal aromatase inhibitor which is or has been used in Japan for the treatment of breast cancer.

Pharmacodynamics of aromatase inhibitors
Generation	Medication	Dosage	% inhibition^{a}	Class^{b}	IC_{50}^{c}
First	Testolactone	250 mg 4x/day p.o.	?	Type I	?
First	Testolactone	100 mg 3x/week i.m.	?	Type I	?
First	Rogletimide	200 mg 2x/day p.o. 400 mg 2x/day p.o. 800 mg 2x/day p.o.	50.6% 63.5% 73.8%	Type II	?
First	Aminoglutethimide	250 mg mg 4x/day p.o.	90.6%	Type II	4,500 nM
Second	Formestane	125 mg 1x/day p.o. 125 mg 2x/day p.o. 250 mg 1x/day p.o.	72.3% 70.0% 57.3%	Type I	30 nM
Second	Formestane	250 mg 1x/2 weeks i.m. 500 mg 1x/2 weeks i.m. 500 mg 1x/1 week i.m.	84.8% 91.9% 92.5%	Type I	30 nM
Second	Fadrozole	1 mg 1x/day p.o. 2 mg 2x/day p.o.	82.4% 92.6%	Type II	?
Third	Exemestane	25 mg 1x/day p.o.	97.9%	Type I	15 nM
Third	Anastrozole	1 mg 1x/day p.o. 10 mg 1x/day p.o.	96.7–97.3% 98.1%	Type II	10 nM
Third	Letrozole	0.5 mg 1x/day p.o. 2.5 mg 1x/day p.o.	98.4% 98.9%–>99.1%	Type II	2.5 nM
Footnotes: ^{a} = In postmenopausal women. ^{b} = Type I: Steroidal, irreversible (substrate-binding site). Type II: Nonsteroidal, reversible (binding to and interference with the cytochrome P450 heme moiety). ^{c} = In breast cancer homogenates. Sources: See template.
