= Rogletimide =

Chemical compound

Clinical data
- Other names: Roglethimide; Pyridoglutethimide
- Routes of administration: By mouth
- Drug class: Aromatase inhibitor

Identifiers
- IUPAC name: 3-ethyl-3-(pyridin-4-yl)piperidine-2,6-dione
- CAS Number: 92788-10-8
- PubChem CID: 56487
- ChemSpider: 50963
- UNII: 14P4QR28QF
- CompTox Dashboard (EPA): DTXSID60869670

Chemical and physical data
- Formula: C_{12}H_{14}N_{2}O_{2}
- Molar mass: 218.256 g·mol^{−1}
- 3D model (JSmol): Interactive image
- SMILES: O=C1NC(=O)CCC1(c2ccncc2)CC

Rogletimide, also known as pyridoglutethimide, is a medication which was never marketed. It is related in chemical structure to the sedative/hypnotic drug glutethimide, but instead has pharmacological activity as a selective aromatase inhibitor similar to the related drug aminoglutethimide and has no significant sedative-hypnotic effect. This makes it potentially useful in the treatment of breast cancer, and with fewer side effects than aminoglutethimide, but its lower potency caused it to be unsuccessful in clinical trials.

Pharmacodynamics of aromatase inhibitors
Generation	Medication	Dosage	% inhibition^{a}	Class^{b}	IC_{50}^{c}
First	Testolactone	250 mg 4x/day p.o.	?	Type I	?
First	Testolactone	100 mg 3x/week i.m.	?	Type I	?
First	Rogletimide	200 mg 2x/day p.o. 400 mg 2x/day p.o. 800 mg 2x/day p.o.	50.6% 63.5% 73.8%	Type II	?
First	Aminoglutethimide	250 mg mg 4x/day p.o.	90.6%	Type II	4,500 nM
Second	Formestane	125 mg 1x/day p.o. 125 mg 2x/day p.o. 250 mg 1x/day p.o.	72.3% 70.0% 57.3%	Type I	30 nM
Second	Formestane	250 mg 1x/2 weeks i.m. 500 mg 1x/2 weeks i.m. 500 mg 1x/1 week i.m.	84.8% 91.9% 92.5%	Type I	30 nM
Second	Fadrozole	1 mg 1x/day p.o. 2 mg 2x/day p.o.	82.4% 92.6%	Type II	?
Third	Exemestane	25 mg 1x/day p.o.	97.9%	Type I	15 nM
Third	Anastrozole	1 mg 1x/day p.o. 10 mg 1x/day p.o.	96.7–97.3% 98.1%	Type II	10 nM
Third	Letrozole	0.5 mg 1x/day p.o. 2.5 mg 1x/day p.o.	98.4% 98.9%–>99.1%	Type II	2.5 nM
Footnotes: ^{a} = In postmenopausal women. ^{b} = Type I: Steroidal, irreversible (substrate-binding site). Type II: Nonsteroidal, reversible (binding to and interference with the cytochrome P450 heme moiety). ^{c} = In breast cancer homogenates. Sources: See template.

== Synthesis ==
Synthesis: Patent:

Base catalyzed alkylation of ethyl 4-pyridylacetate [54401-85-3] (1) with iodoethane gives ethyl 2-(4-pyridyl)butyrate [76766-56-8] (2). Base catalyzed conjugate addition of the carbanion to acrylamide (3) gives (4). The last step is an intramolecular cyclization to rogletimide (5).
