= Hormone-sensitive cancer =

Type of cancer

A hormone-sensitive cancer, or hormone-dependent cancer, is a type of cancer that is dependent on a hormone for growth and/or survival. Examples include breast cancer, which is dependent on estrogens like estradiol, and prostate cancer, which is dependent on androgens like testosterone.

Hormones can cause some tumors to grow and spread, which are so-called hormone-sensitive or hormone-dependent cancer. If a tumor is hormone-sensitive, it means that there are special proteins called receptors on cells surface. When the hormone binds to a matched receptor, it results in the growth and spread of cancer cells.

== Mechanism of carcinogenesis ==
While tumor initiating event for hormone-related cancers can be varied, the promotion event and subsequent proliferation is driven by a sex hormone. Both endogenous and exogenous hormones, by driving cell proliferation, increased the number of cell divisions and the opportunity for random genetic errors to lead to cancer.

== Hormone-sensitive cancer types ==
=== Breast cancer ===
Breast cancer is often hormone responsive, since growth or regression of tumors can often be regulated by appropriate endocrine manipulations. Estrogen and progesterone seem to be main hormones involved in growth of breast cancer.

=== Ovarian cancer ===
Ovarian cancer can be affected by estrogen. β-estradiol (E2) can stimulate the growth of some estrogen receptor(ER)-positive ovarian carcinoma cells, and these effects may be related with changes in the cellular levels of steroid hormone receptors.

=== Uterine cancer ===
Uterine or endometrial cancer are activated by estrogen and progesterone are related to this type. The uterine endometrium is extraordinary sensitive to steroid hormones, observation that women who ovulate and produce progesterone have an extremely low possibility to get endometrial cancer proves progesterone as a critical inhibitor of carcinogenesis.

=== Prostate cancer ===
Prostate cancer is dependent on androgens like testosterone and similar hormones that can help it grow and spread.

== Treatment ==
Treatments for hormone-sensitive-cancers include blocking the synthesis or action of the hormone or surgery to remove the organ that produces the hormone. Androgen deprivation therapy includes treatment with androgen receptor antagonists and/or surgical removal of the testes while estrogen deprivation therapy involves treatment with estrogen receptor antagonists and/or surgical removal of the ovaries.

=== Receptor antagonists ===
Antiandrogens or antiestrogen are used to block the binding of androgen and estrogen to their respective nuclear hormone receptors and thereby blocks the proliferative effects of these hormone on hormone dependent cancer.

For example, the antiestrogen tamoxifen used for the treatment of breast cancer while the antiandrogen bicalutamide alone or in combination with castration is used to treat prostate cancer.

Interruption of hormonal stimulus. For example, tamoxifen can slow the progression until actual hormone independence occurs in the pathway later. In more recent years, evidence in support of this cell proliferation model of hormone responsive cancer etiology has continued to accumulate. Anti-hormone therapies are proved to be effective in stopping progression and thereby increasing the time to recurrence or death.

=== Receptor agonists ===
Progesterone is regarded as the major endometrial tumor suppressor,

=== Synthesis inhibitors ===
Various agents that block key events in the synthesis of hormones are sometimes used to treat hormone dependent cancers. Aromatase inhibitors such as anastrozole block the synthesis of estrogen while CYP17A1 inhibitors such as abiraterone block the synthesis of androgen. Gonadotropin-releasing hormone antagonists blocks the signaling that stimulates androgen synthesis.

=== Surgery ===
As the growth of hormone dependent cancer is driven by sex hormones, surgical removal of the organs that synthesizes the sex hormone is sometimes performed. In the case of prostate cancer, orchiectomy (surgical castration) of the testes is sometimes performed while oophorectomy (surgical removal of the ovaries) is sometimes performed to prevent breast cancer in high risk women with BRCA1 or BRCA2 mutations.
