= Acute tryptophan depletion =

Research technique

Acute tryptophan depletion (ATD) is a technique used extensively to study the effect of low serotonin in the brain. This experimental approach reduces the availability of tryptophan, an amino acid which serves as the precursor to serotonin. The lack of mood-lowering effects after ATD in healthy subjects seems to contradict a direct causal relationship between acutely decreased serotonin levels and depression. However, mood-lowering effects are observed in certain vulnerable individuals. For example, a meta-analysis show that the effect size for the effects of tryptophan depletion on mood in depressed people not taking antidepressants was large (Hedge's g = −1.9 (95% CIs −3.02 to −0.78) Hence, a more accurate interpretation is that tryptophan depletion studies suggest a role for 5-HT in people vulnerable to depression and in those remitted on SSRI treatment
