= Aromatase inhibitor =

Class of drugs

- Drug class
- Anastrozole, a non steroidal aromatase inhibitor and a widely used drug in the treatment of breast cancer.

Class identifiers
- Synonyms: Estrogen synthesis inhibitors; Estrogen synthase inhibitors; Estrogen blockers
- Use: Breast cancer, infertility, precocious puberty, medical abortion, gynecomastia, endometriosis, short stature, others
- ATC code: L02BG
- Biological target: Aromatase
- Chemical class: Steroidal; Nonsteroidal

Legal status

Aromatase inhibitors (AIs) are a class of drugs that block the enzyme aromatase, which is responsible for converting androgens into estrogens. They are primarily used in the treatment of hormone receptor-positive breast cancer, particularly in postmenopausal women, but can also be used in premenopausal women when combined with ovarian suppression therapy. AIs are also used in men for conditions such as gynecomastia and hormone-sensitive cancers, and may be used off-label to manage estrogen levels during testosterone therapy. Additionally, they are sometimes used for chemoprevention in individuals at high risk of developing breast cancer.

Aromatase is the enzyme that catalyzes a key aromatization step in the synthesis of estrogen. It converts the enone ring of androgen precursors such as testosterone, to a phenol, completing the synthesis of estrogen. As such, AIs are estrogen synthesis inhibitors. Because hormone-positive breast and ovarian cancers are dependent on estrogen for growth, AIs are taken to either block the production of estrogen or block the action of estrogen on receptors.

== Medical uses ==
=== Cancer ===
In contrast to premenopausal women, in whom most of the estrogen is produced in the ovaries, in postmenopausal women estrogen is mainly produced in peripheral tissues of the body. Because some breast cancers respond to estrogen, lowering estrogen production at the site of the cancer (i.e. the adipose tissue of the breast) with aromatase inhibitors has been proven to be an effective treatment for hormone-sensitive breast cancer in postmenopausal women. Aromatase inhibitors are generally not used to treat breast cancer in premenopausal women because, prior to menopause, the decrease in estrogen activates the hypothalamus and pituitary axis to increase gonadotropin secretion, which in turn stimulates the ovary to increase androgen production. The heightened gonadotropin levels also upregulate the aromatase promoter, increasing aromatase production in the setting of increased androgen substrate. This would counteract the effect of the aromatase inhibitor in premenopausal women, as total estrogen would increase.

Ongoing areas of clinical research include optimizing adjuvant hormonal therapy in postmenopausal women with breast cancer. Tamoxifen (a SERM) traditionally was the drug treatment of choice, but the ATAC trial (Arimidex, Tamoxifen, Alone or in Combination) showed that in women with localized estrogen receptor-positive breast cancer, women receiving the AI anastrozole had better results than the tamoxifen group. Trials of AIs used as adjuvant therapy, when given to prevent relapse after surgery for breast cancer, show that they are associated with a better disease-free survival than tamoxifen, but few conventionally-analyzed clinicals trials have shown that AIs have an overall survival advantage compared with tamoxifen, and there is no good evidence they are better tolerated.

=== Gynecomastia ===
Aromatase inhibitors have been approved for the treatment of gynecomastia in children and adolescents.

=== Ovulation induction ===
Ovarian stimulation with the aromatase inhibitor letrozole has been proposed for ovulation induction in order to treat unexplained female infertility. In a multi-center study funded by the National Institute of Child Health and Development, ovarian stimulation with letrozole resulted in a significantly lower frequency of multiple gestation (i.e., twins or triplets) but also a lower frequency of live birth, as compared with gonadotropin but not with clomiphene.

=== Delayed Puberty ===
Aromatase inhibitors have been used experimentally in improving outcomes for males with delayed puberty and idiopathic short stature. The reduced estrogen levels as a result of AI use lead to a deceleration of growth plate fusion, allowing more time for HGH treatment to have effect before the closure of growth plates.

== Side effects ==
In women, side effects include an increased risk for developing osteoporosis and joint disorders such as arthritis, arthrosis, and joint pain. Men do not appear to exhibit the same adverse effects on bone health. Bisphosphonates are sometimes prescribed to prevent the osteoporosis induced by aromatase inhibitors, but also have another serious side effect, osteonecrosis of the jaw. As statins have a bone strengthening effect, combining a statin with an aromatase inhibitor could help prevent fractures and suspected cardiovascular risks, without potential of causing osteonecrosis of the jaw. The more common adverse events associated with the use of aromatase inhibitors include decreased rate of bone maturation and growth, infertility, aggressive behavior, adrenal insufficiency, kidney failure, hair loss, and liver dysfunction. Patients with liver, kidney or adrenal abnormalities are at a higher risk of developing adverse events.

== Mechanism of action ==
Often used as a cancer treatment in postmenopausal women, AIs work by blocking the conversion of androstenedione and testosterone into estrone and estradiol, respectively, which are both crucial to the growth of developing breast cancers (AIs are also effective at treating ovarian cancer, but less commonly so). In the diagram, the adrenal gland (1) releases androstenedione (3) while the ovaries (2) secrete testosterone (4). Both hormones travel to peripheral tissues or a breast cell (5), where they would be converted into estrone (8) or estradiol (9) if not for AIs (7), which prevent the enzyme CYP19A1 (also known as aromatase or estrogen synthase) (6) from catalyzing the reaction that turns androstenedione and testosterone into estrone and estradiol. In the diagram, Part A represents the successful conversion of androstenedione and testosterone into estrone and estradiol in the liver. Part B represents the blockage of this conversion by aromatase inhibitors both in peripheral tissues and in the breast tumor itself.

Aromatase inhibitors work by inhibiting the action of the enzyme aromatase, which converts androgens into estrogens by a process called aromatization. As breast tissue is stimulated by estrogens, decreasing their production is a way of suppressing recurrence of the breast tumor tissue. The main source of estrogen is the ovaries in premenopausal women, while in post-menopausal women most of the body's estrogen is produced in peripheral tissues (outside the CNS), and also a few CNS sites in various regions within the brain. Estrogen is produced and acts locally in these tissues, but any circulating estrogen, which exerts systemic estrogenic effects in men and women, is the result of estrogen escaping local metabolism and spreading to the circulatory system.

Pharmacodynamics of aromatase inhibitors
Generation	Medication	Dosage	% inhibition^{a}	Class^{b}	IC_{50}^{c}
First	Testolactone	250 mg 4x/day p.o.	?	Type I	?
First	Testolactone	100 mg 3x/week i.m.	?	Type I	?
First	Rogletimide	200 mg 2x/day p.o. 400 mg 2x/day p.o. 800 mg 2x/day p.o.	50.6% 63.5% 73.8%	Type II	?
First	Aminoglutethimide	250 mg mg 4x/day p.o.	90.6%	Type II	4,500 nM
Second	Formestane	125 mg 1x/day p.o. 125 mg 2x/day p.o. 250 mg 1x/day p.o.	72.3% 70.0% 57.3%	Type I	30 nM
Second	Formestane	250 mg 1x/2 weeks i.m. 500 mg 1x/2 weeks i.m. 500 mg 1x/1 week i.m.	84.8% 91.9% 92.5%	Type I	30 nM
Second	Fadrozole	1 mg 1x/day p.o. 2 mg 2x/day p.o.	82.4% 92.6%	Type II	?
Third	Exemestane	25 mg 1x/day p.o.	97.9%	Type I	15 nM
Third	Anastrozole	1 mg 1x/day p.o. 10 mg 1x/day p.o.	96.7–97.3% 98.1%	Type II	10 nM
Third	Letrozole	0.5 mg 1x/day p.o. 2.5 mg 1x/day p.o.	98.4% 98.9%–>99.1%	Type II	2.5 nM
Footnotes: ^{a} = In postmenopausal women. ^{b} = Type I: Steroidal, irreversible (substrate-binding site). Type II: Nonsteroidal, reversible (binding to and interference with the cytochrome P450 heme moiety). ^{c} = In breast cancer homogenates. Sources: See template.

== Types ==
There are two types of aromatase inhibitors approved to treat breast cancer:

- Irreversible steroidal inhibitors, such as exemestane (Aromasin), forms a permanent and deactivating bond with the aromatase enzyme.
- Nonsteroidal inhibitors, such as the triazoles anastrozole (Arimidex) and letrozole (Femara), inhibit the synthesis of estrogen via reversible competition.

== Members ==
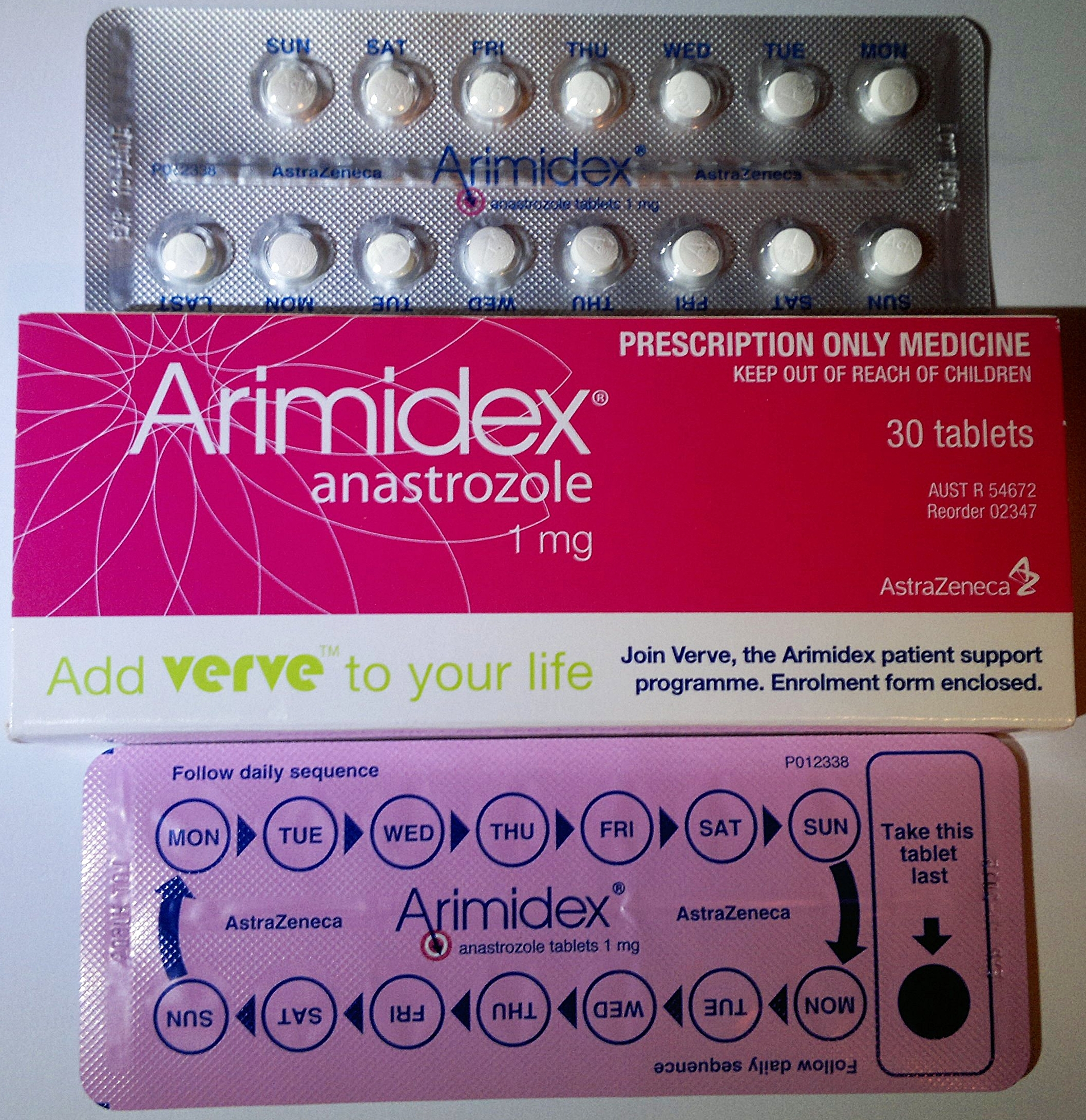
Arimidex (anastrozole) 1 mg tablets

Aromatase inhibitors (AIs) include:

=== Non-selective ===
- Aminoglutethimide (Elipten, Cytadren, Orimeten)
- Testolactone (Teslac)

=== Selective ===
- Anastrozole (Arimidex)
- Letrozole (Femara)
- Exemestane (Aromasin)
- Vorozole (R-76713; Rivizor)
- Formestane (Lentaron)
- Fadrozole (Afema)

=== Unknown ===
- 1,4,6-Androstatrien-3,17-dione (ATD)
- 4-Androstene-3,6,17-trione ("6-OXO")

In addition to pharmaceutical AIs, some natural elements have aromatase inhibiting effects, such as damiana leaves.

== History ==
The development of aromatase inhibitors was first pioneered by the work of British pharmacologist Angela Brodie at the University of Maryland School of Medicine, first demonstrating efficacy of Formestane in clinical trials in 1982. The drug was first marketed in 1994.

Investigations and research has been undertaken to study the use of aromatase inhibitors to stimulate ovulation, and also to suppress estrogen production. Aromatase inhibitors have been shown to reverse age-related declines in testosterone, including primary hypogonadism. Extracts of certain mushrooms have been shown to inhibit aromatase when evaluated by enzyme assays, with white mushroom having shown the greatest ability to inhibit the enzyme. AIs have also been used experimentally in the treatment of adolescents with delayed puberty.

== Research ==
Research suggests the common table mushroom has anti-aromatase properties and therefore possible anti-estrogen activity. In 2009, a case-control study of the eating habits of 2,018 women in southeast China revealed that women who consumed greater than 10 grams of fresh mushrooms or greater than 4 grams of dried mushrooms per day had an approximately 50% lower incidence of breast cancer. Chinese women who consumed mushrooms and green tea had a 90% lower incidence of breast cancer. However the study was relatively small (2,018 patients participating) and limited to Chinese women of southeast China.

The extract from the herb damiana (Turnera diffusa) has been found to suppress aromatase activity, including the isolated compounds pinocembrin and acacetin.

== Natural aromatase inhibitors ==
Species Name	Common name	Family	Type
Aesculus glabra	Ohio buckeye	Hippocastanaceae	Plant
Agaricus bisporus	Baby button mushroom	Agaricaceae	Fungus
Allium sp.	White onions	Liliaceae	Plant
Alpinia purpurata	Red ginger	Zingerberaceae	Plant
Brassica oleracea	Cauliflower	Brassicaceae	Plant

== See also ==
- CYP17A1 inhibitor
- Estrogen deprivation therapy
- Selective estrogen receptor degrader
