= ATC code L02 =

ATC code L02 Endocrine therapy is a therapeutic subgroup of the Anatomical Therapeutic Chemical Classification System, a system of alphanumeric codes developed by the World Health Organization (WHO) for the classification of drugs and other medical products. Subgroup L02 is part of the anatomical group L Antineoplastic and immunomodulating agents.

Codes for veterinary use (ATCvet codes) can be created by placing the letter Q in front of the human ATC code: for example, QL02.
National versions of the ATC classification may include additional codes not present in this list, which follows the WHO version.

== L02A Hormones and related agents ==
=== L02AA Estrogens ===
L02AA01 Diethylstilbestrol
L02AA02 Polyestradiol phosphate
L02AA03 Ethinylestradiol
L02AA04 Fosfestrol

=== L02AB Progestogens ===
L02AB01 Megestrol
L02AB02 Medroxyprogesterone
L02AB03 Gestonorone

=== L02AE Gonadotropin-releasing hormone analogues ===
L02AE01 Buserelin
L02AE02 Leuprorelin
L02AE03 Goserelin
L02AE04 Triptorelin
L02AE05 Histrelin
L02AE51 Leuprorelin and bicalutamide

== L02B Hormone antagonists and related agents ==
=== L02BA Anti-estrogens ===
L02BA01 Tamoxifen
L02BA02 Toremifene
L02BA03 Fulvestrant
L02BA04 Elacestrant
L02BA05 Camizestrant

=== L02BB Anti-androgens ===
L02BB01 Flutamide
L02BB02 Nilutamide
L02BB03 Bicalutamide
L02BB04 Enzalutamide
L02BB05 Apalutamide
L02BB06 Darolutamide

=== L02BG Aromatase inhibitors ===
L02BG01 Aminogluthetimide
L02BG02 Formestane
L02BG03 Anastrozole
L02BG04 Letrozole
L02BG05 Vorozole
L02BG06 Exemestane

=== L02BX Other hormone antagonists and related agents ===
L02BX01 Abarelix
L02BX02 Degarelix
L02BX03 Abiraterone
L02BX04 Relugolix
L02BX53 Abiraterone and corticosteroids
