= Formestane =

Chemical compound

Clinical data
- Trade names: Lentaron, others
- Other names: 4-Hydroxyandrost-4-ene-3,17-dione
- AHFS/Drugs.com: International Drug Names
- Routes of administration: Intramuscular injection
- Drug class: Aromatase inhibitor; Antiestrogen
- ATC code: L02BG02 (WHO)

Identifiers
- IUPAC name: (8R,9S,10R,13S,14S)-4-hydroxy-10,13-dimethyl-2,6,7,8,9,11,12,14,15,16-decahydro-1H-cyclopenta[a]phenanthrene-3,17-dione
- CAS Number: 566-48-3
- PubChem CID: 11273
- ChemSpider: 10799
- UNII: PUB9T8T355
- KEGG: D07260
- ChEBI: CHEBI:75172
- ChEMBL: ChEMBL132530
- CompTox Dashboard (EPA): DTXSID3034113
- ECHA InfoCard: 100.153.838

Chemical and physical data
- Formula: C_{19}H_{26}O_{3}
- Molar mass: 302.414 g·mol^{−1}
- 3D model (JSmol): Interactive image
- SMILES: O=C4C(/O)=C3/CC[C@@H]2[C@H](CC[C@@]1(C(=O)CC[C@H]12)C)[C@@]3(C)CC4
- InChI: InChI=1S/C19H26O3/c1-18-10-8-15(20)17(22)14(18)4-3-11-12-5-6-16(21)19(12,2)9-7-13(11)18/h11-13,22H,3-10H2,1-2H3/t11-,12-,13-,18+,19-/m0/s1; Key:OSVMTWJCGUFAOD-KZQROQTASA-N

Formestane, formerly sold under the brand name Lentaron among others, is a steroidal, selective aromatase inhibitor which is used in the treatment of estrogen receptor-positive breast cancer in postmenopausal women. The drug is not active orally, and was available only as an intramuscular depot injection. Formestane was not approved by the United States FDA and the injectable form that was used in Europe in the past has been withdrawn from the market. Formestane is an analogue of androstenedione.

Formestane is often used to suppress the production of estrogens from anabolic steroids or prohormones. It also acts as a prohormone to 4-hydroxytestosterone, an active steroid which displays weak androgenic activity in addition to acting as a weak aromatase inhibitor.

Pharmacodynamics of aromatase inhibitors
Generation	Medication	Dosage	% inhibition^{a}	Class^{b}	IC_{50}^{c}
First	Testolactone	250 mg 4x/day p.o.	?	Type I	?
First	Testolactone	100 mg 3x/week i.m.	?	Type I	?
First	Rogletimide	200 mg 2x/day p.o. 400 mg 2x/day p.o. 800 mg 2x/day p.o.	50.6% 63.5% 73.8%	Type II	?
First	Aminoglutethimide	250 mg mg 4x/day p.o.	90.6%	Type II	4,500 nM
Second	Formestane	125 mg 1x/day p.o. 125 mg 2x/day p.o. 250 mg 1x/day p.o.	72.3% 70.0% 57.3%	Type I	30 nM
Second	Formestane	250 mg 1x/2 weeks i.m. 500 mg 1x/2 weeks i.m. 500 mg 1x/1 week i.m.	84.8% 91.9% 92.5%	Type I	30 nM
Second	Fadrozole	1 mg 1x/day p.o. 2 mg 2x/day p.o.	82.4% 92.6%	Type II	?
Third	Exemestane	25 mg 1x/day p.o.	97.9%	Type I	15 nM
Third	Anastrozole	1 mg 1x/day p.o. 10 mg 1x/day p.o.	96.7–97.3% 98.1%	Type II	10 nM
Third	Letrozole	0.5 mg 1x/day p.o. 2.5 mg 1x/day p.o.	98.4% 98.9%–>99.1%	Type II	2.5 nM
Footnotes: ^{a} = In postmenopausal women. ^{b} = Type I: Steroidal, irreversible (substrate-binding site). Type II: Nonsteroidal, reversible (binding to and interference with the cytochrome P450 heme moiety). ^{c} = In breast cancer homogenates. Sources: See template.

== Chemistry ==
=== Synthesis ===
The synthesis of formestane was reported: Related patents:

500pxclass=skin-invert-image

Reaction of androstenedione with alkaline hydrogen peroxide gives the 4,5-epoxyandrosta-3,17-dione, PC13633174. Addition of acid completes the synthesis of formestane.
