= Anastrozole =

Chemical compound

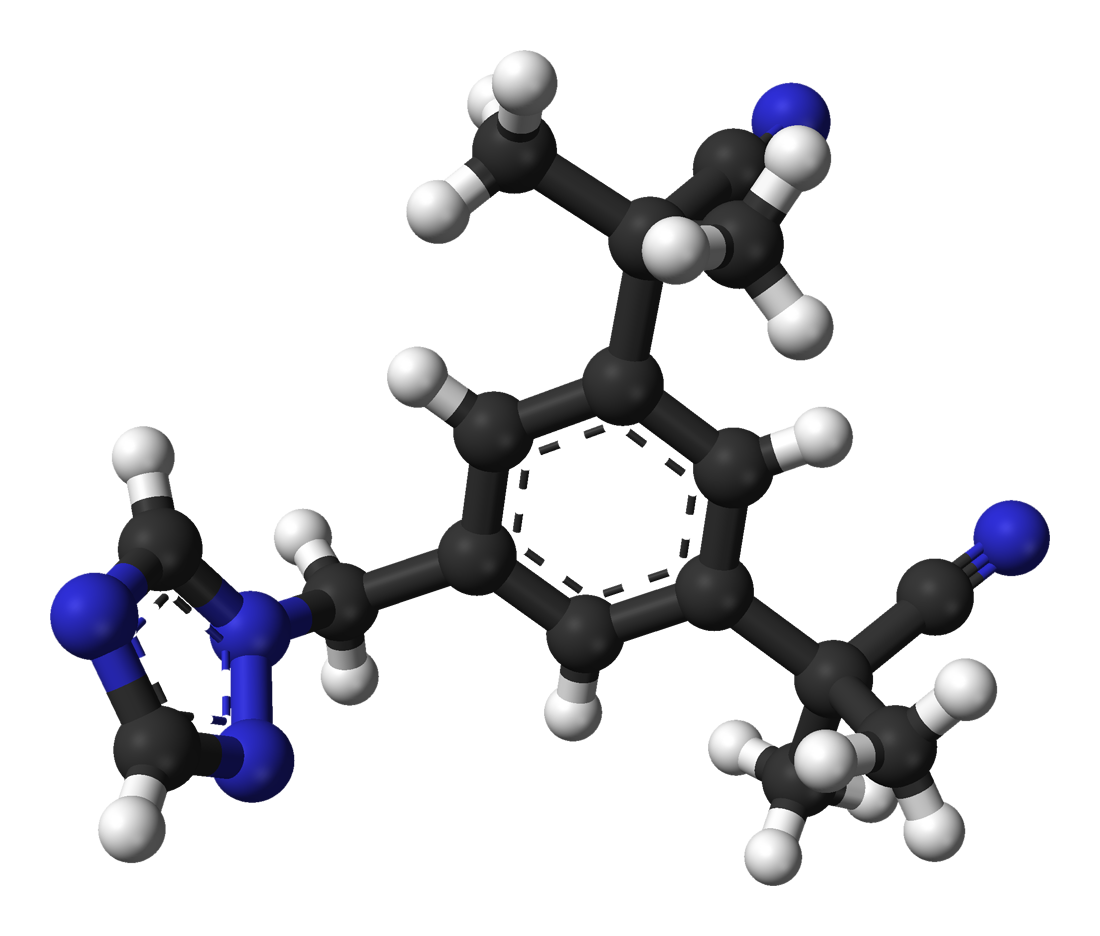

Clinical data
- Trade names: Arimidex, Aremed, others
- Other names: Anastrazole; anastrozol; ICI-D1033; ZD-1033
- AHFS/Drugs.com: Monograph
- MedlinePlus: a696018
- License data: US DailyMed: Anastrozole
- Pregnancy category: AU: C
- Routes of administration: By mouth
- Drug class: Aromatase inhibitor; Antiestrogen
- ATC code: L02BG03 (WHO)

Legal status
- Legal status: AU: S4 (Prescription only); CA: ℞-only; UK: POM (Prescription only); US: ℞-only

Pharmacokinetic data
- Bioavailability: Unknown (but well-absorbed in animals)
- Protein binding: 40%
- Metabolism: Liver (~85%) (N-dealkylation, hydroxylation, glucuronidation)
- Elimination half-life: 40–50 hours
- Excretion: Urine (11%)

Identifiers
- IUPAC name: 2,2'-[5-(1H-1,2,4-triazol-1-ylmethyl)-1,3-phenylene]bis(2-methylpropanenitrile)
- CAS Number: 120511-73-1
- PubChem CID: 2187
- IUPHAR/BPS: 5137
- DrugBank: DB01217
- ChemSpider: 2102
- UNII: 2Z07MYW1AZ
- KEGG: D00960
- ChEBI: CHEBI:2704
- ChEMBL: ChEMBL1399
- CompTox Dashboard (EPA): DTXSID9022607
- ECHA InfoCard: 100.129.723

Chemical and physical data
- Formula: C_{17}H_{19}N_{5}
- Molar mass: 293.374 g·mol^{−1}
- 3D model (JSmol): Interactive image
- SMILES: N#CC(C)(C)c1cc(Cn2cncn2)cc(c1)C(C)(C)C#N
- InChI: InChI=1S/C17H19N5/c1-16(2,9-18)14-5-13(8-22-12-20-11-21-22)6-15(7-14)17(3,4)10-19/h5-7,11-12H,8H2,1-4H3; Key:YBBLVLTVTVSKRW-UHFFFAOYSA-N

Anastrozole, sold under the brand name Arimidex among others, is an antiestrogenic medication used in addition to other treatments for breast cancer. Specifically it is used for hormone receptor-positive breast cancer. It has also been used to prevent breast cancer in those at high risk. It is taken orally.

Common side effects of anastrozole include hot flashes, altered mood, joint pain, and nausea. Severe side effects include an increased risk of heart disease and osteoporosis. Use during pregnancy may harm the fetus. Anastrozole is in the aromatase-inhibiting family of medications. It works by blocking the production of estrogens in the body, and hence has antiestrogenic effects.

Anastrozole was patented in 1987 and was approved for medical use in 1995. It is on the World Health Organization's List of Essential Medicines. Anastrozole is available as a generic medication. In 2023, it was the 194th most commonly prescribed medication in the United States, with more than 2 million prescriptions.

== Medical uses ==
=== Breast cancer ===
Anastrozole is used in the treatment and prevention of breast cancer in women. The Arimidex, Tamoxifen, Alone or in Combination (ATAC) trial was of localized breast cancer and women received either anastrozole, the selective estrogen receptor modulator tamoxifen, or both for five years, followed by five years of follow-up. After more than 5 years the group that received anastrozole had better results than the tamoxifen group. The trial suggested that anastrozole is the preferred medical therapy for postmenopausal women with localized estrogen receptor-positive breast cancer.

=== Early puberty ===
Anastrozole is used at a dosage of 0.5 to 1 mg/day in combination with the antiandrogen bicalutamide in the treatment of peripheral precocious puberty, for instance due to familial male-limited precocious puberty (testotoxicosis) and McCune–Albright syndrome, in boys.

=== Available forms ===
Anastrozole is available in the form of 1 mg oral tablets. No alternative forms or routes are available.

== Contraindications ==
Contraindications of anastrozole include hypersensitivity to anastrozole or any other component of anastrozole formulations, pregnancy, and breastfeeding. Hypersensitivity reactions to anastrozole including anaphylaxis, angioedema, and urticaria have been observed.

== Side effects ==
Common side effects of anastrozole (≥10% incidence) include hot flashes, asthenia, arthritis, pain, arthralgia, hypertension, depression, nausea and vomiting, rash, osteoporosis, bone fractures, back pain, insomnia, headache, bone pain, peripheral edema, coughing, dyspnea, pharyngitis, and lymphedema. Serious but rare adverse effects (<0.1% incidence) include skin reactions such as lesions, ulcers, or blisters; allergic reactions with swelling of the face, lips, tongue, and/or throat that may cause difficulty swallowing or breathing; and abnormal liver function tests as well as hepatitis.

== Interactions ==
Anastrozole is thought to have clinically negligible inhibitory effects on the cytochrome P450 enzymes CYP1A2, CYP2A6, CYP2D6, CYP2C8, CYP2C9, and CYP2C19. As a result, it is thought that drug interactions of anastrozole with cytochrome P450 substrates are unlikely. No clinically significant drug interactions have been reported with anastrozole as of 2003.

Anastrozole does not affect circulating levels of tamoxifen or its major metabolite N-desmethyltamoxifen. However, tamoxifen has been found to decrease steady-state area-under-the-curve levels of anastrozole by 27%. But estradiol levels were not significantly different in the group that received both anastrozole and tamoxifen compared to the anastrozole alone group, so the decrease in anastrozole levels is not thought to be clinically important.

== Pharmacology ==
=== Pharmacodynamics ===
Anastrozole works by reversibly binding to the aromatase enzyme, and through competitive inhibition blocks the conversion of androgens to estrogens in peripheral (extragonadal) tissues. The medication has been found to achieve 96.7% to 97.3% inhibition of aromatase at a dosage of 1 mg/day and 98.1% inhibition of aromatase at a dosage of 10 mg/day in humans. As such, 1 mg/day is considered to be the minimal dosage required to achieve maximal suppression of aromatase with anastrozole. This decrease in aromatase activity results in an at least 85% decrease in estradiol levels in postmenopausal women. Levels of corticosteroids and other adrenal steroids are unaffected by anastrozole.

Pharmacodynamics of aromatase inhibitors
Generation	Medication	Dosage	% inhibition^{a}	Class^{b}	IC_{50}^{c}
First	Testolactone	250 mg 4x/day p.o.	?	Type I	?
First	Testolactone	100 mg 3x/week i.m.	?	Type I	?
First	Rogletimide	200 mg 2x/day p.o. 400 mg 2x/day p.o. 800 mg 2x/day p.o.	50.6% 63.5% 73.8%	Type II	?
First	Aminoglutethimide	250 mg mg 4x/day p.o.	90.6%	Type II	4,500 nM
Second	Formestane	125 mg 1x/day p.o. 125 mg 2x/day p.o. 250 mg 1x/day p.o.	72.3% 70.0% 57.3%	Type I	30 nM
Second	Formestane	250 mg 1x/2 weeks i.m. 500 mg 1x/2 weeks i.m. 500 mg 1x/1 week i.m.	84.8% 91.9% 92.5%	Type I	30 nM
Second	Fadrozole	1 mg 1x/day p.o. 2 mg 2x/day p.o.	82.4% 92.6%	Type II	?
Third	Exemestane	25 mg 1x/day p.o.	97.9%	Type I	15 nM
Third	Anastrozole	1 mg 1x/day p.o. 10 mg 1x/day p.o.	96.7–97.3% 98.1%	Type II	10 nM
Third	Letrozole	0.5 mg 1x/day p.o. 2.5 mg 1x/day p.o.	98.4% 98.9%–>99.1%	Type II	2.5 nM
Footnotes: ^{a} = In postmenopausal women. ^{b} = Type I: Steroidal, irreversible (substrate-binding site). Type II: Nonsteroidal, reversible (binding to and interference with the cytochrome P450 heme moiety). ^{c} = In breast cancer homogenates. Sources: See template.

=== Pharmacokinetics ===
The bioavailability of anastrozole in humans is unknown, but it was found to be well-absorbed in animals. Absorption of anastrozole is linear over a dosage range of 1 to 20 mg/day in humans and does not change with repeated administration. Food does not significantly influence the extent of absorption of anastrozole. Peak levels of anastrozole occur a median 3 hours after administration, but with a wide range of 2 to 12 hours. Steady-state levels of anastrozole are achieved within 7 to 10 days of continuous administration, with 3.5-fold accumulation. However, maximal suppression of estradiol levels occurs within 3 or 4 days of therapy.

Active efflux of anastrozole by P-glycoprotein at the blood–brain barrier has been found to limit the central nervous system penetration of anastrozole in rodents, whereas this was not the case with letrozole and vorozole. As such, anastrozole may have peripheral selectivity in humans, although this has yet to be confirmed. In any case, estradiol is synthesized peripherally and readily crosses the blood–brain barrier, so anastrozole would still expected to reduce estradiol levels in the central nervous system to a certain degree. The plasma protein binding of anastrozole is 40%.

The metabolism of anastrozole is by N-dealkylation, hydroxylation, and glucuronidation. Inhibition of aromatase is due to anastrozole itself rather than to metabolites, with the major circulating metabolite being inactive. The elimination half-life of anastrozole is 40 to 50 hours (1.7 to 2.1 days). This allows for convenient once-daily administration. The medication is eliminated predominantly by metabolism in the liver (83 to 85%) but also by residual excretion by the kidneys, unchanged (11%). Anastrozole is excreted primarily in urine but also to a lesser extent in feces.

== Chemistry ==
Anastrozole is a nonsteroidal benzyl triazole. It is also known as α,α,α',α'-tetramethyl-5-(1H-1,2,4-triazol-1-ylmethyl)-m-benzenediacetonitrile. Anastrozole is structurally related to letrozole, fadrozole, and vorozole, with all being classified as azoles.

== History ==
Anastrozole was patented by Imperial Chemical Industries (ICI) in 1987 and was approved for medical use, specifically the treatment of breast cancer, in 1995.

== Society and culture ==
=== Generic names ===
Anastrozole is the generic name of the drug and its INN, USAN, BAN, and JAN.

=== Brand names ===
Anastrozole is primarily sold under the brand name Arimidex. However, it is also marketed under a variety of other brand names throughout the world.

=== Availability ===
Anastrozole is available widely throughout the world.

== Research ==
Anastrozole is surprisingly ineffective at treating gynecomastia, in contrast to selective estrogen receptor modulators like tamoxifen.

Anastrozole was under development for the treatment of female infertility but did not complete development and hence was never approved for this indication.

An anastrozole and levonorgestrel vaginal ring (developmental code name BAY 98–7196) was under development for use as a hormonal contraceptive and treatment for endometriosis. Development was discontinued in November 2018, and the formulation was never marketed.

Anastrozole increases testosterone levels in males and has been studied as an alternative method of androgen replacement therapy in men with hypogonadism. However, there are concerns about its long-term influence on bone mineral density in this patient population, as well as other adverse effects.
