= Letrozole =

Breast cancer drug

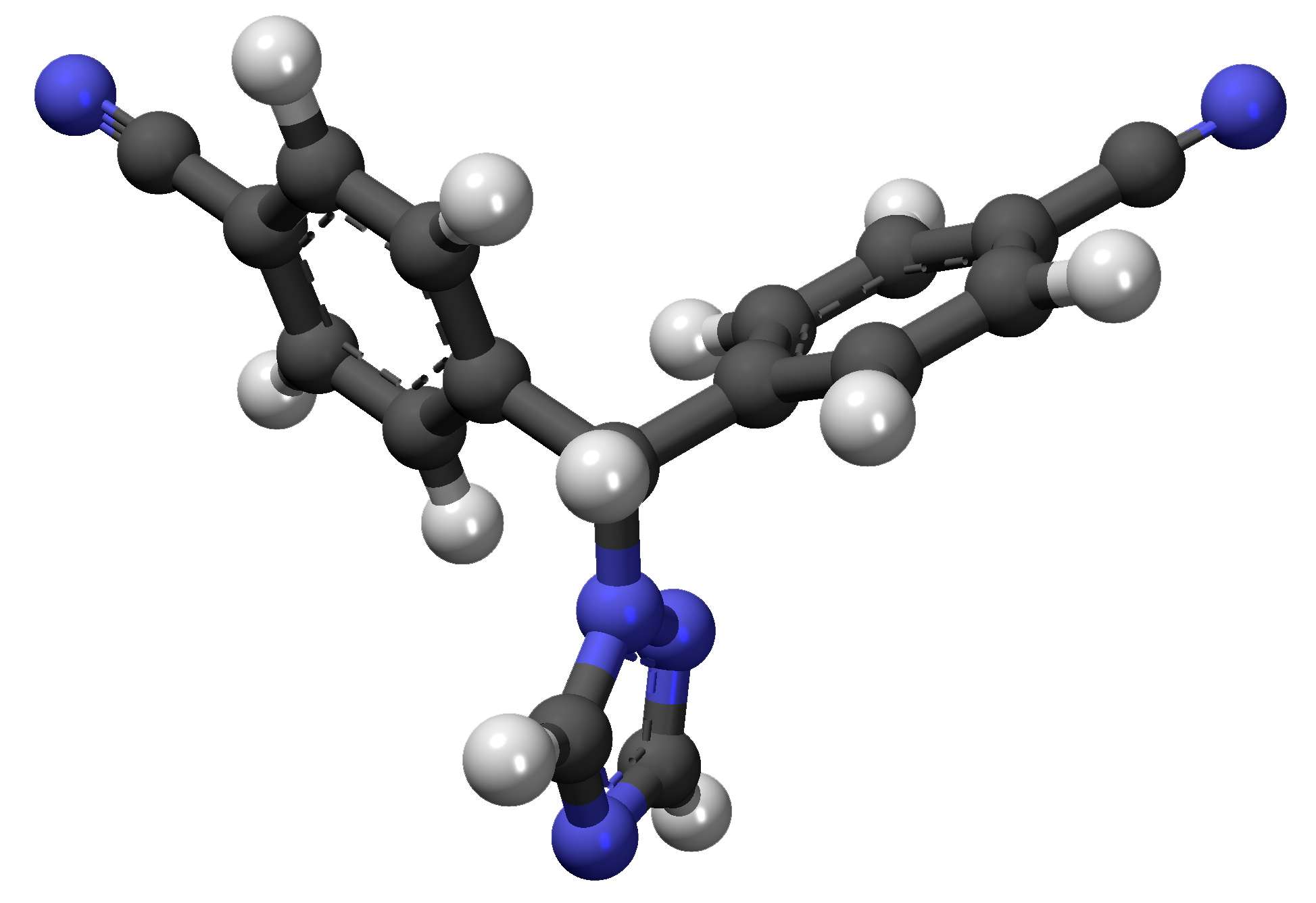

Clinical data
- Trade names: Femara, Sybali, others
- AHFS/Drugs.com: Monograph
- MedlinePlus: a698004
- License data: US DailyMed: Letrozole
- Routes of administration: By mouth
- Drug class: Aromatase inhibitor; Antiestrogen
- ATC code: L02BG04 (WHO)

Legal status
- Legal status: CA: Schedule VII; UK: POM (Prescription only); US: ℞-only; EU: Rx-only

Pharmacokinetic data
- Bioavailability: 99.9%
- Protein binding: 60%, mainly to albumin
- Metabolism: pharmacologically-inactive metabolites Bis(4-cyanophenyl)methanol and 4,4'-dicyanobenzophenone.
- Elimination half-life: 2 days
- Excretion: Kidney

Identifiers
- IUPAC name: 4,4'-((1H-1,2,4-triazol-1-yl)methylene)dibenzonitrile
- CAS Number: 112809-51-5
- PubChem CID: 3902
- IUPHAR/BPS: 5209
- DrugBank: DB01006
- ChemSpider: 3765
- UNII: 7LKK855W8I
- KEGG: D00964
- ChEBI: CHEBI:6413
- ChEMBL: ChEMBL1444
- CompTox Dashboard (EPA): DTXSID4023202
- ECHA InfoCard: 100.200.357

Chemical and physical data
- Formula: C_{17}H_{11}N_{5}
- Molar mass: 285.310 g·mol^{−1}
- 3D model (JSmol): Interactive image
- SMILES: N#Cc1ccc(cc1)C(c2ccc(C#N)cc2)n3ncnc3
- InChI: InChI=1S/C17H11N5/c18-9-13-1-5-15(6-2-13)17(22-12-20-11-21-22)16-7-3-14(10-19)4-8-16/h1-8,11-12,17H; Key:HPJKCIUCZWXJDR-UHFFFAOYSA-N

Letrozole, sold under the brand name Femara among others, is an aromatase inhibitor medication that is used in the treatment of breast cancer for post-menopausal women.

It was patented in 1986 and approved for medical use in 1996. In 2021, it was the 222nd most commonly prescribed medication in the United States, with more than 1 million prescriptions. It is on the World Health Organization's List of Essential Medicines.

== Medical uses ==
=== Breast cancer ===
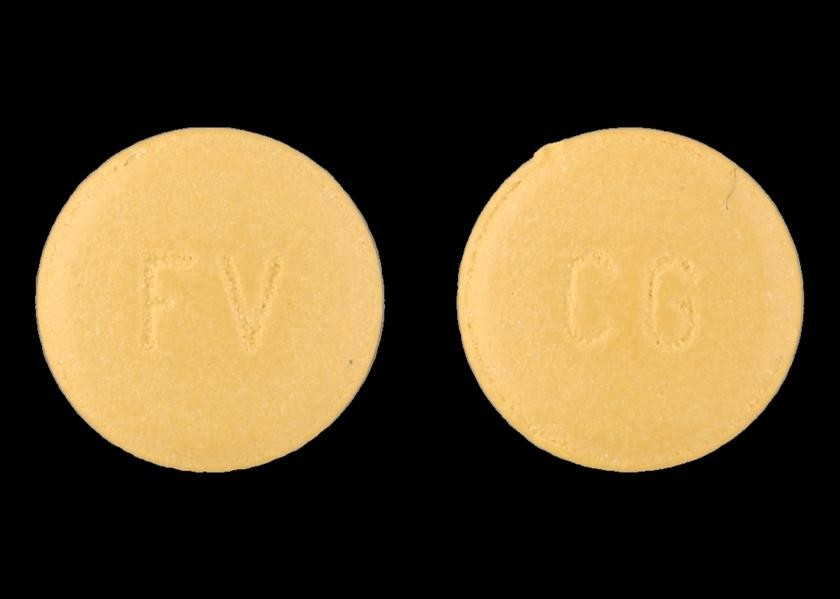
Femara 2.5 mg oral tablet

Letrozole is indicated for adjuvant treatment of postmenopausal women with hormone receptor positive early breast cancer; extended adjuvant treatment of postmenopausal women with early breast cancer who have received prior standard adjuvant tamoxifen therapy; first and second-line treatment of postmenopausal women with hormone receptor positive or unknown advanced breast cancer.

Letrozole is approved by the United States Food and Drug Administration (FDA) for the treatment of local or metastatic breast cancer that is hormone receptor positive or has an unknown receptor status in postmenopausal women.

==== Comparison with tamoxifen ====
Tamoxifen is also used to treat hormonally-responsive breast cancer, but it does so by interfering with the estrogen receptor. However, letrozole is effective only in post-menopausal women, in whom estrogen is produced predominantly in peripheral tissues (i.e. in adipose tissue, like that of the breast) and a number of sites in the brain. In pre-menopausal women, the main source of estrogen is from the ovaries not the peripheral tissues, and letrozole is ineffective.

In the BIG 1–98 Study, of post-menopausal women with hormonally-responsive breast cancer, letrozole reduced the recurrence of cancer, but did not change survival rate, compared to tamoxifen.

=== Ovulation induction ===
Letrozole is recommended as the first-line medication for ovulation induction in polyendocrine metabolic ovarian syndrome. Compared to clomiphene (Clomid), it causes higher number of ovulation and live birth rates. It has the same rate of multiple pregnancies (such as twins), and the same rate of miscarriages. The use of letrozole is typically off-label, and some countries may not allow off-label use.

India banned the usage of letrozole in 2011, citing potential risks to infants while in 2012, an Indian parliamentary committee said that their office of the drug controller had colluded with letrozole's makers to approve the drug for infertility in India. The committee also stated that letrozole's use for infertility was illegal worldwide.

=== Medical abortion ===
Studies have shown that the efficacy of first-trimester misoprostol-only medical abortion can be improved by the addition of letrozole.

=== Use in sports ===
Letrozole is considered a performance enhancing drug by the World Antidoping Agency (WADA), as are other aromatase inhibitors, because they may be used to counteract the side effects of anabolic steroids. Letrozole itself is not a performance enhancer.

== Contraindications ==
Letrozole is contraindicated in women having a pre-menopausal hormonal status. Precautions are advised against becoming pregnant while using letrozole; on the loss of bone mineral density; on the increased level of cholesterol and fat in the blood; and on dizziness and against driving. Breast feeding (lactation) is also counterindicated.

== Side effects ==
The most common side effects are sweating, hot flushes, arthralgia (joint pain), and fatigue.

Generally, side effects include signs and symptoms of hypoestrogenism. There is concern that long term use may lead to osteoporosis, which is why in certain patient populations such as post-menopausal women or osteoporotics, bisphosphonates may also be prescribed.

== Interactions ==
Letrozole inhibits the liver enzyme CYP2A6, and to a lesser extent CYP2C19, in vitro, but no relevant interactions with drugs like cimetidine and warfarin have been observed. Letrozole also inhibits CYP2A7.

== Pharmacology ==
=== Pharmacodynamics ===
Letrozole is an orally active, nonsteroidal, selective aromatase inhibitor and hence an antiestrogen. It prevents aromatase from producing estrogens by competitive, reversible binding to the heme of its cytochrome P450 unit. The action is specific, and letrozole does not reduce production of corticosteroids.

Pharmacodynamics of aromatase inhibitors
Generation	Medication	Dosage	% inhibition^{a}	Class^{b}	IC_{50}^{c}
First	Testolactone	250 mg 4x/day p.o.	?	Type I	?
First	Testolactone	100 mg 3x/week i.m.	?	Type I	?
First	Rogletimide	200 mg 2x/day p.o. 400 mg 2x/day p.o. 800 mg 2x/day p.o.	50.6% 63.5% 73.8%	Type II	?
First	Aminoglutethimide	250 mg mg 4x/day p.o.	90.6%	Type II	4,500 nM
Second	Formestane	125 mg 1x/day p.o. 125 mg 2x/day p.o. 250 mg 1x/day p.o.	72.3% 70.0% 57.3%	Type I	30 nM
Second	Formestane	250 mg 1x/2 weeks i.m. 500 mg 1x/2 weeks i.m. 500 mg 1x/1 week i.m.	84.8% 91.9% 92.5%	Type I	30 nM
Second	Fadrozole	1 mg 1x/day p.o. 2 mg 2x/day p.o.	82.4% 92.6%	Type II	?
Third	Exemestane	25 mg 1x/day p.o.	97.9%	Type I	15 nM
Third	Anastrozole	1 mg 1x/day p.o. 10 mg 1x/day p.o.	96.7–97.3% 98.1%	Type II	10 nM
Third	Letrozole	0.5 mg 1x/day p.o. 2.5 mg 1x/day p.o.	98.4% 98.9%–>99.1%	Type II	2.5 nM
Footnotes: ^{a} = In postmenopausal women. ^{b} = Type I: Steroidal, irreversible (substrate-binding site). Type II: Nonsteroidal, reversible (binding to and interference with the cytochrome P450 heme moiety). ^{c} = In breast cancer homogenates. Sources: See template.

== Research ==
The antiestrogen action of letrozole has been shown to be useful in pretreatment for termination of pregnancy, in combination with misoprostol. It can be used in place of mifepristone, which is expensive and unavailable in many countries.

Letrozole is sometimes used as a treatment for gynecomastia, although it is probably most effective at this if caught in an early stage (such as in users of anabolic steroids).

Some studies have shown that letrozole can be used to promote spermatogenesis in male patients with nonobstructive azoospermia.

Letrozole has also been shown to delay the fusing of the growth plates in mice. When used in combination with growth hormone, letrozole has been shown effective in one adolescent boy with a short stature.

Letrozole has also been used to treat endometriosis.

Endometrial stromal sarcomas are hormonally sensitive tumors as it is represented that letrozole reduces serum estrogen levels. Letrozole is well-tolerated and is a good option for long-term management of this disease. Also in a study on Uterine myoma the volume was successfully reduced by use of an aromatase inhibitor. Rapid onset of action and avoidance of initial gonadotropin flare with an aromatase inhibitor.

Letrozole has been documented to be safe and effective for improving height and pubertal outcomes in children living with constitutional delay in growth and puberty, and is better than testosterone with regard to improvement in testicular volume and delaying bone-age progression. This was documented in a meta-analysis published by Dutta et al. which analyzed data from 7 different randomized controlled trials.
