= Exemestane =

Breast cancer medication

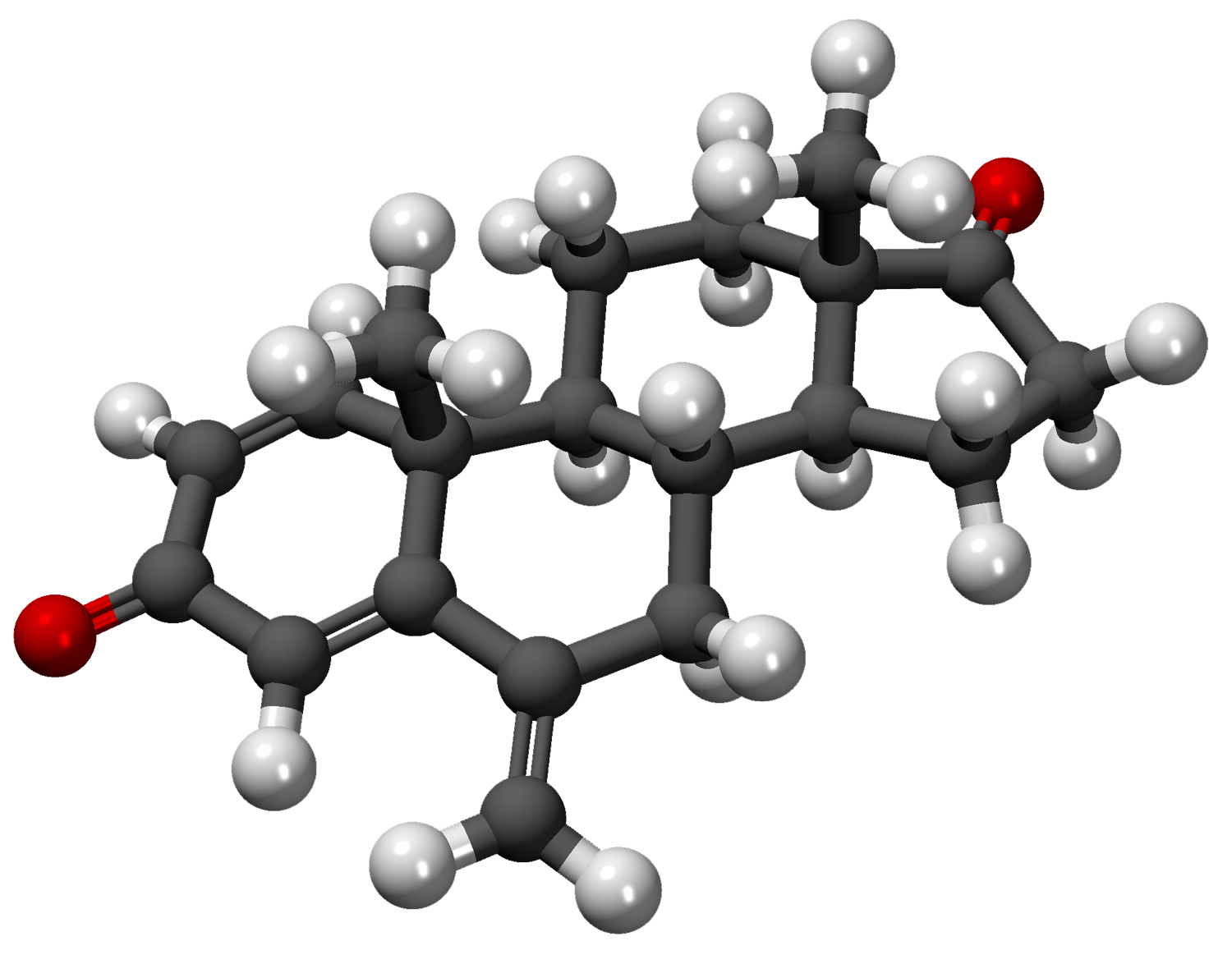

Clinical data
- Pronunciation: /ˌɛksəˈmɛˌsteɪn/ EK-sə-ME-stayn
- Trade names: Aromasin
- Other names: FCE-24304
- AHFS/Drugs.com: Monograph
- MedlinePlus: a607006
- Routes of administration: By mouth
- Drug class: Aromatase inhibitor; Antiestrogen
- ATC code: L02BG06 (WHO)

Legal status
- Legal status: UK: POM (Prescription only); US: ℞-only

Pharmacokinetic data
- Bioavailability: ~60%
- Protein binding: 90%
- Metabolism: Liver (CYP3A4, aldo-keto reductase)
- Elimination half-life: 24 hours
- Duration of action: 4–5 days
- Excretion: Urine and feces ~ 1:1 (mainly metabolites)

Identifiers
- IUPAC name: 6-Methylideneandrosta-1,4-diene-3,17-dione
- CAS Number: 107868-30-4
- PubChem CID: 60198
- IUPHAR/BPS: 7073
- DrugBank: DB00990
- ChemSpider: 54278
- UNII: NY22HMQ4BX
- KEGG: D00963
- ChEBI: CHEBI:4953
- ChEMBL: ChEMBL1200374
- CompTox Dashboard (EPA): DTXSID5023037
- ECHA InfoCard: 100.171.149

Chemical and physical data
- Formula: C_{20}H_{24}O_{2}
- Molar mass: 296.410 g·mol^{−1}
- 3D model (JSmol): Interactive image
- SMILES: O=C\1\C=C/[C@]3(C(=C/1)/C(=C)C[C@H]4[C@@H]2CCC(=O)[C@]2(CC[C@H]34)C)C
- InChI: InChI=1S/C20H24O2/c1-12-10-14-15-4-5-18(22)20(15,3)9-7-16(14)19(2)8-6-13(21)11-17(12)19/h6,8,11,14-16H,1,4-5,7,9-10H2,2-3H3/t14-,15-,16-,19+,20-/m0/s1; Key:BFYIZQONLCFLEV-DAELLWKTSA-N

Exemestane, sold under the brand name Aromasin among others, is a medication used to treat breast cancer. It is a member of the class of antiestrogens known as aromatase inhibitors. Some breast cancers require estrogen to grow. Those cancers have estrogen receptors (ERs), and are called ER-positive. They may also be called estrogen-responsive, hormonally-responsive, or hormone-receptor-positive. Aromatase is an enzyme that synthesizes estrogen. Aromatase inhibitors block the synthesis of estrogen. This lowers the estrogen level, and slows the growth of cancers.

== Medical uses ==
Exemestane is indicated for the adjuvant treatment of postmenopausal women with estrogen-receptor positive early breast cancer who have received two to three years of tamoxifen and are switched to it for completion of a total of five consecutive years of adjuvant hormonal therapy. US FDA approval was in October 1999.

Exemestane is also indicated for the treatment of advanced breast cancer in postmenopausal women whose disease has progressed following tamoxifen therapy.

For premenopausal women with hormone-receptor–positive breast cancer, adjuvant treatment with ovarian suppression plus the aromatase inhibitor exemestane, as compared with ovarian suppression plus tamoxifen, provides a new treatment option that reduces the risk of recurrence. The TEXT and SOFT trials demonstrated improved disease free survival in patients treated with exemestane and ovarian suppression compared to the tamoxifen and ovarian suppression group. Premenopausal women who receive ovarian suppression may now benefit from an aromatase inhibitor, a class of drugs that until now has been recommended only for postmenopausal women.

== Contraindications ==
The drug is contraindicated in premenopausal women, which of course includes pregnant and lactating women.

== Side effects ==
The most common side effects (more than 10% of patients) are hot flashes and sweating, which are typical of estrogen deficiency as caused by exemestane, and also insomnia, headache, and joint pain. Nausea and fatigue are mainly observed in patients with advanced breast cancer.

An occasional decrease in lymphocytes has been observed in approximately 20% of patients receiving Aromasin, particularly in patients with pre-existing lymphopenia.

Exemestane has androgenic properties similarly to formestane and can produce androgenic side effects such as acne and weight gain, although these are generally associated with supratherapeutic dosages of the drug.

== Overdose ==
Single doses of up to at least 32-fold (800 mg), as well as continuous therapy with 24-fold (600 mg) the usual daily dose are well tolerated. No life-threatening overdosing is known in humans, but only in animal studies with 2000- to 4000-fold doses (adjusted to body surface area).

== Interactions ==
Exemestane is metabolized by the liver enzyme CYP3A4. While the CYP3A4 inhibitor ketoconazole had no significant effect on exemestane levels in a clinical trial, the strong CYP3A4 inductor rifampicin significantly cut exemestane levels about in half (AUC −54%, C_{max} −41% for a single dose), potentially compromising its effectiveness. Other 3A4 inductors such as carbamazepine and St John's Wort are expected to have similar effects. The clinical relevance of this effect has not been investigated.

Estrogens probably reduce exemestane effectiveness: It would usually be counter-productive to reduce the body's estrogen synthesis with exemestane and then substitute estrogen with pharmaceuticals.

== Pharmacology ==
=== Pharmacodynamics ===
Exemestane is an oral steroidal aromatase inhibitor that is used in ER-positive breast cancer in addition to surgery and/or radiation in post-menopausal women.

The main source of estrogen is the ovaries in premenopausal women, while in post-menopausal women most of the body's estrogen is produced via the conversion of androgens into estrogen by the aromatase enzyme in the peripheral tissues (i.e. adipose tissue like that of the breast) and a number of sites in the brain. Estrogen is produced locally via the actions of the aromatase enzyme in these peripheral tissues where it acts locally. Any circulating estrogen in post-menopausal women as well as men is the result of estrogen escaping local metabolism and entering the circulatory system.

Exemestane is an irreversible steroidal aromatase inactivator of type I, structurally related to the natural substrate 4-androstenedione. It acts as a false substrate for the aromatase enzyme, and is processed to an intermediate that binds irreversibly to the active site of the enzyme causing its inactivation, an effect also known as "suicide inhibition." By being structurally similar to enzyme targets, exemestane permanently binds to the enzymes, preventing them from converting androgen into estrogen.

Type II aromatase inhibitors such as anastrozole and letrozole, by contrast, are not steroids and work by interfering with the aromatase's heme.

A study conducted on young adult males found that the estrogen suppression rate for exemestane varied from 35% for estradiol (E2) to 70% for estrone (E1).

Pharmacodynamics of aromatase inhibitors
Generation	Medication	Dosage	% inhibition^{a}	Class^{b}	IC_{50}^{c}
First	Testolactone	250 mg 4x/day p.o.	?	Type I	?
First	Testolactone	100 mg 3x/week i.m.	?	Type I	?
First	Rogletimide	200 mg 2x/day p.o. 400 mg 2x/day p.o. 800 mg 2x/day p.o.	50.6% 63.5% 73.8%	Type II	?
First	Aminoglutethimide	250 mg mg 4x/day p.o.	90.6%	Type II	4,500 nM
Second	Formestane	125 mg 1x/day p.o. 125 mg 2x/day p.o. 250 mg 1x/day p.o.	72.3% 70.0% 57.3%	Type I	30 nM
Second	Formestane	250 mg 1x/2 weeks i.m. 500 mg 1x/2 weeks i.m. 500 mg 1x/1 week i.m.	84.8% 91.9% 92.5%	Type I	30 nM
Second	Fadrozole	1 mg 1x/day p.o. 2 mg 2x/day p.o.	82.4% 92.6%	Type II	?
Third	Exemestane	25 mg 1x/day p.o.	97.9%	Type I	15 nM
Third	Anastrozole	1 mg 1x/day p.o. 10 mg 1x/day p.o.	96.7–97.3% 98.1%	Type II	10 nM
Third	Letrozole	0.5 mg 1x/day p.o. 2.5 mg 1x/day p.o.	98.4% 98.9%–>99.1%	Type II	2.5 nM
Footnotes: ^{a} = In postmenopausal women. ^{b} = Type I: Steroidal, irreversible (substrate-binding site). Type II: Nonsteroidal, reversible (binding to and interference with the cytochrome P450 heme moiety). ^{c} = In breast cancer homogenates. Sources: See template.

=== Pharmacokinetics ===
Exemestane is quickly absorbed from the gut, but undergoes a strong first-pass effect in the liver. Highest blood plasma concentrations are reached after 1.2 hours in breast cancer patients and after 2.9 hours in healthy subjects. Maximal aromatase inhibition occurs after two to three days. 90% of the absorbed substance are bound to plasma proteins. The liver enzyme CYP3A4 oxidizes the methylidene group in position 6, and the 17-keto group (on the five-membered ring) is reduced by aldo-keto reductases to an alcohol. Of the resulting metabolites, 40% are excreted via the urine and 40% via the feces within a week. The original substance accounts for only 1% of excretion in the urine. The terminal half-life is 24 hours.

== Chemistry ==
4-Androstenedione for comparison

Exemestane is known chemically as 6-methylideneandrosta-1,4-diene-3,17-dione. Like the aromatase inhibitors formestane and atamestane, exemestane is a steroid that is structurally similar to 4-androstenedione, the natural substrate of aromatase. It is distinguished from the natural substance only by the methylidene group in position 6 and an additional double bond in position 1.

Pure exemestane is a white to off-white powder that is soluble in DMSO to at least 20 mg/mL. Optical rotation [α]_{D} is +250 to 300° (per g/100 cm^{3} and decimetre at 589 nm wavelength).

== Society and culture ==
=== Performance enhancement ===
Exemestane has been used in doping to raise luteinizing hormone (LH) and follicle stimulating hormone (FSH) levels, which in turn increases the ratio of male over female sexual hormones and so improves performance. The drug also counteracts gynecomastia as well as fat and water retention following excessive aromatase production due to testosterone doping. It is also used by steroid users to lower female sexual horomone levels following a cycle of steroids, often called a "post-cycle therapy", it is also used alongside Selective estrogen receptor modulators in this.

Along with other aromatase inhibitors, exemestane is on the World Anti-Doping Agency's list of prohibited substances.

== Research ==
Oral exemestane 25 mg/day for 2–3 years of adjuvant therapy was generally more effective than 5 years of continuous adjuvant tamoxifen in the treatment of postmenopausal women with early-stage estrogen receptor-positive/unknown receptor status breast in a large well-designed trial. Preliminary data from the open-label TEAM trial comparing exemestane with tamoxifen indicated in 2009 that exemestane 25 mg/day is also effective in the primary adjuvant treatment of early-stage breast cancer in postmenopausal women.

Interim phase III trial results in 2011 showed that adding everolimus to exemestane therapy against advanced breast cancer can significantly improve progression-free survival compared with exemestane therapy alone.

A Phase III trial was reported in 2011, concluding that the use of exemestane in postmenopausal women at an increased risk for breast cancer reduced the incidence of invasive breast cancer. In 4,560 women, after 35 months, the administration of exemestane at a dose of 25 mg/day resulted in a 65% reduction in the risk of breast cancer compared with placebo; annual incidence rates were 0.19% and 0.55%, respectively (hazard ratio: 0.35; 95% CI [0.18-0.70]; p = 0.002).
