= Aromatase =

Enzyme involved in estrogen production

CYP19A1
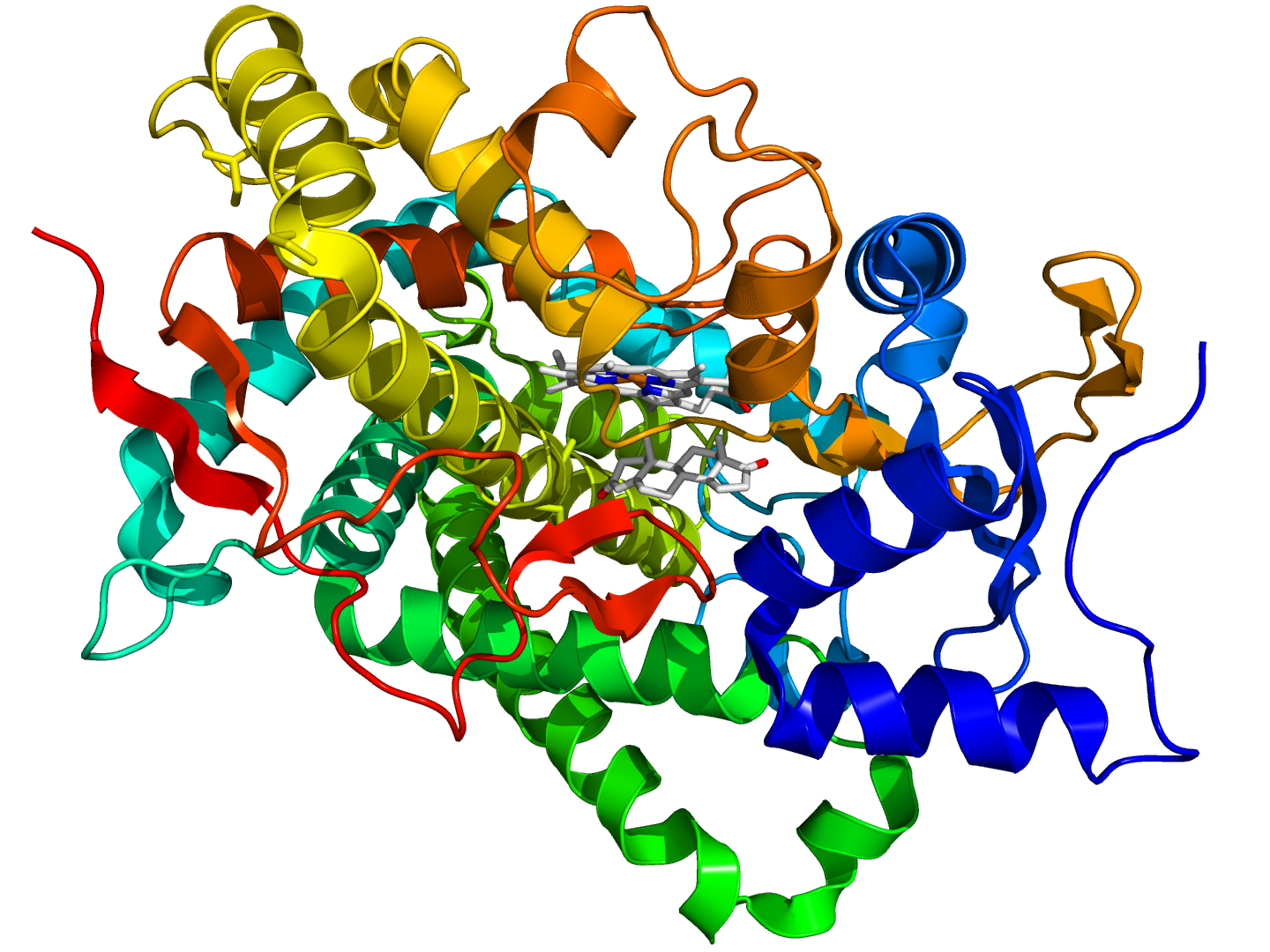

Identifiers
- Aliases: CYP19A1, ARO, ARO1, CPV1, CYAR, CYP19, CYPXIX, P-450AROM, cytochrome P450 family 19 subfamily A member 1
- External IDs: OMIM: 107910; MGI: 88587; GeneCards: CYP19A1
Available structures
PDB	Ortholog search: PDBe RCSB
PDB	List of PDB id codes 3EQM, 3S79, 3S7S, 4GL5, 4GL7, 4KQ8
Enzyme activity
EC #	BRENDA	ExPASy	KEGG	MetaCyc
1.14.14.14	↗	↗	↗	↗

Gene location (Human)
Chr.	Chromosome 15 (human)
Band	15q21.2	Start	51,208,057 bp
Band	15q21.2	End	51,338,601 bp

Gene location (Mouse)
Chr.	Chromosome 9 (mouse)
Band	9 A5.3|9 29.49 cM	Start	54,073,221 bp
Band	9 A5.3|9 29.49 cM	End	54,175,394 bp
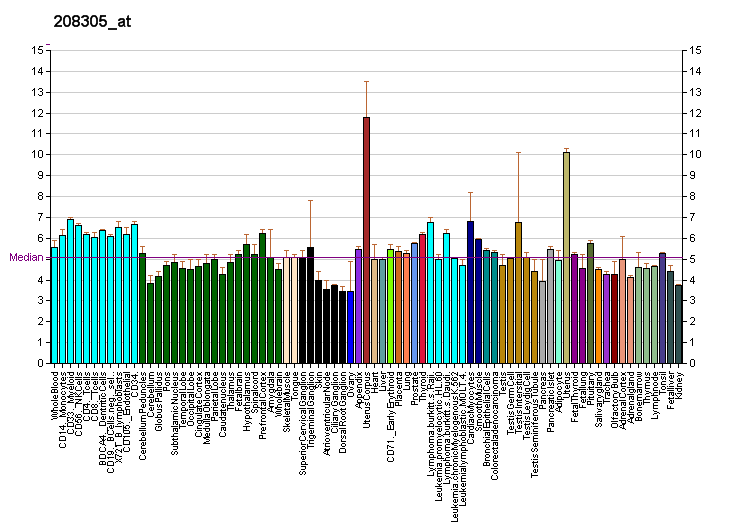
RNA expression pattern
Bgee	Human / Mouse (ortholog); Top expressed in: placenta; right testis; left testis; testicle; tibial nerve; gonad; germinal epithelium; subcutaneous adipose tissue; right ovary; left coronary artery / Top expressed in: spermatocyte; secondary oocyte; zygote; primary oocyte; cumulus cell; ovarian follicle cell; spermatid; meninges; testicle; seminiferous tubule; More reference expression data
BioGPS	More reference expression data
Gene ontology
Molecular function	iron ion binding; oxygen binding; metal ion binding; monooxygenase activity; heme binding; oxidoreductase activity, acting on paired donors, with incorporation or reduction of molecular oxygen; electron transfer activity; oxidoreductase activity; aromatase activity; oxidoreductase activity, acting on paired donors, with incorporation or reduction of molecular oxygen, reduced flavin or flavoprotein as one donor, and incorporation of one atom of oxygen; steroid hydroxylase activity
Cellular component	endoplasmic reticulum membrane; endoplasmic reticulum; membrane; integral component of membrane
Biological process	estrogen biosynthetic process; androgen metabolic process; negative regulation of chronic inflammatory response; prostate gland growth; sterol metabolic process; negative regulation of macrophage chemotaxis; steroid biosynthetic process; female gonad development; female genitalia development; mammary gland development; uterus development; testosterone biosynthetic process; androgen catabolic process; positive regulation of estradiol secretion; electron transport chain
Sources:Amigo / QuickGO
Orthologs
Databases	NCBI: entry; OMA: entry
Species	Human	Mouse
Entrez	1588	13075
Ensembl	ENSG00000137869	ENSMUSG00000032274
UniProt	P11511	P28649
RefSeq (mRNA)	NM_000103; NM_001347248; NM_001347249; NM_001347250; NM_001347251 NM_001347252; NM_001347253; NM_001347254; NM_001347255; NM_001347256; NM_031226	NM_007810; NM_001348171; NM_001348172; NM_001348173
RefSeq (protein)	NP_000094; NP_001334177; NP_001334178; NP_001334179; NP_001334180 NP_001334181; NP_001334182; NP_001334183; NP_001334184; NP_001334185; NP_112503	NP_001335100; NP_001335101; NP_001335102; NP_031836
Location (UCSC)	Chr 15: 51.21 – 51.34 Mb	Chr 9: 54.07 – 54.18 Mb
PubMed search
- Wikidata
View/Edit Human	View/Edit Mouse

Aromatase (EC 1.14.14.14), also called estrogen synthetase or estrogen synthase, is an enzyme responsible for a key step in the biosynthesis of estrogens. It is CYP19A1, a member of the cytochrome P450 superfamily, which are monooxygenases that catalyze many reactions involved in steroidogenesis. In particular, aromatase is responsible for the aromatization of androgens into estrogens. The enzyme aromatase can be found in many tissues including gonads (granulosa cells), brain, adipose tissue, placenta, blood vessels, skin, and bone, as well as in tissue of endometriosis, uterine fibroids, breast cancer, and endometrial cancer. It is an important factor in sexual development.

== Function ==
Aromatase is localized in the endoplasmic reticulum where it is regulated by tissue-specific promoters that are in turn controlled by hormones, cytokines, and other factors. It catalyzes the last steps of estrogen biosynthesis from androgens (specifically, it transforms androstenedione to estrone and testosterone to estradiol). These steps include three successive hydroxylations of the 19-methyl group of androgens, followed by simultaneous elimination of the methyl group as formate and aromatization of the A-ring.

Androstenedione + 3O_{2} + 3NADPH + 3H^{+} $\rightleftharpoons$ Estrone + Formate + 4H_{2}O + 3NADP^{+}
Testosterone + 3O_{2} + 3NADPH + 3H^{+} $\rightleftharpoons$ 17β-estradiol + Formate + 4H_{2}O + 3NADP^{+}

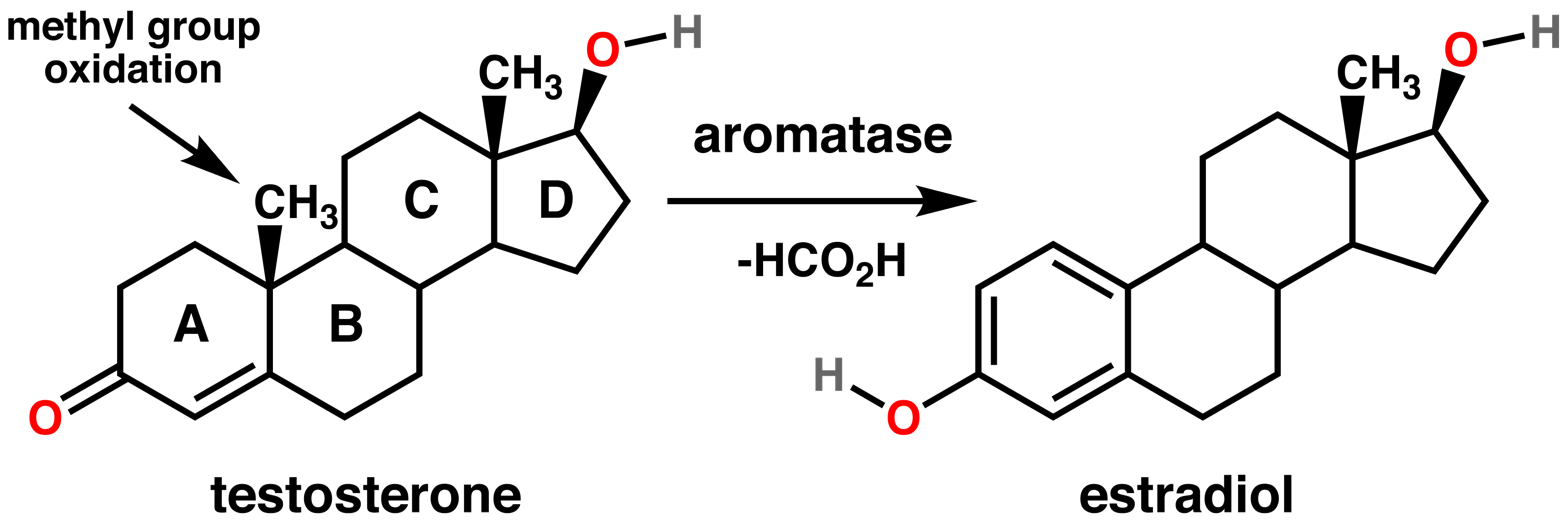
General reaction for the conversion of testosterone to estradiol catalyzed by aromatase. Steroids are composed of four fused rings (labeled A-D). Aromatase converts the ring labeled "A" into an aromatic state.

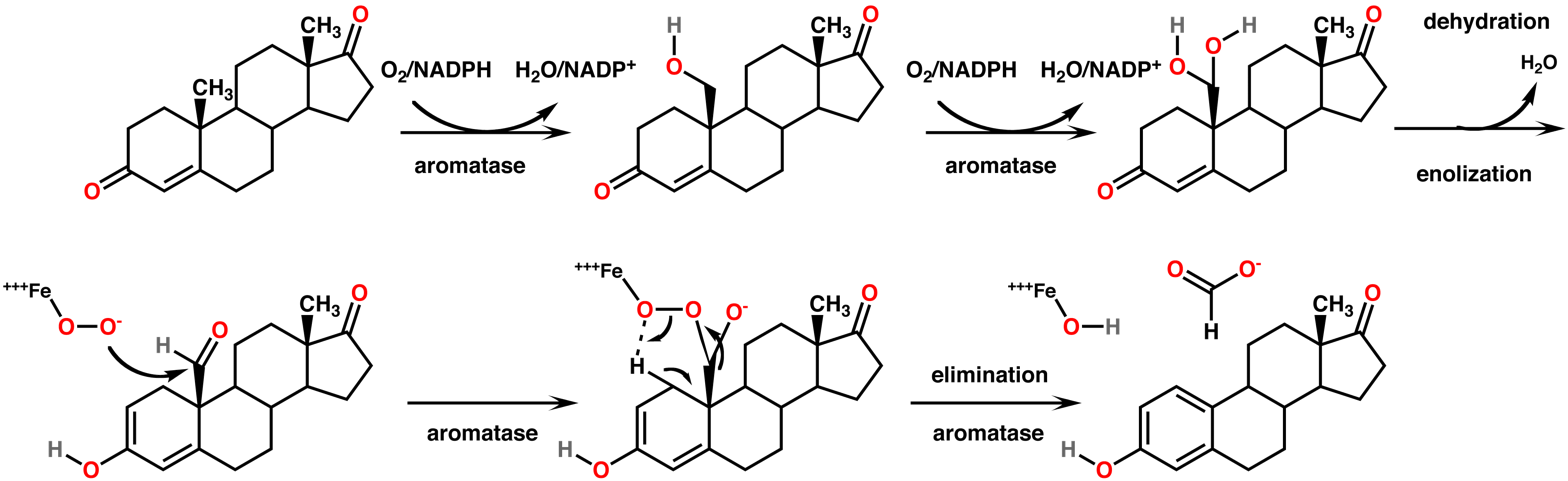
Catalytic mechanism of aromatase for the conversion of androstenedione to estrone. The methyl group is oxidized and subsequently eliminated.

== Expression ==
Aromatase is expressed in the gonads, placenta, brain, adipose tissue, bone, and other tissues. It is almost undetectable in adult human liver.

== Genomics ==
The gene expresses two transcript variants. In humans, the gene CYP19, located on chromosome 15q21.1, encodes aromatase.

CYP19 is present in an early-diverging chordate, the cephalochordate amphioxus (the Florida lancelet, Branchiostoma floridae), but not in the earlier diverging tunicate Ciona intestinalis. Thus, the aromatase gene evolved early in chordate evolution and does not appear to be present in nonchordate invertebrates (e.g. insects, molluscs, echinoderms, sponges, corals). However, estrogens may be synthesized in some of these organisms, via other unknown pathways.

== Activity ==
Aromatase activity is increased by age, obesity, insulin, gonadotropins, and alcohol. It also appears to be enhanced in certain estrogen-dependent local tissue next to breast tissue, endometrial cancer, endometriosis, and uterine fibroids.

Aromatase activity is decreased or antagonized by prolactin, anti-Müllerian hormone and glyphosate.

== Role in sex-determination ==
Aromatase is generally highly present during the differentiation of ovaries. It is also susceptible to environmental influences, particularly temperature. In species with temperature-dependent sex determination, aromatase is expressed in higher quantities at temperatures that yield female offspring. Despite the fact that data suggest temperature controls aromatase quantities, other studies have shown that aromatase can overpower the effects of temperature: if exposed to more aromatase at a male-producing temperature, the organism will develop female and conversely, if exposed to less aromatase at female-producing temperatures, the organism will develop male (see sex reversal). In organisms that develop through genetic sex determination, temperature does not affect aromatase expression and function, suggesting that aromatase is the target molecule for temperature during TSD (for challenges to this argument, see temperature-dependent sex determination). It varies from species to species whether it is the aromatase protein that has different activity at different temperatures or whether the amount of transcription undergone by the aromatase gene is what is temperature-sensitive, but in either case, differential development is observed at different temperatures.

== Role in neuroprotection ==
Aromatase in the brain is usually only expressed in neurons. However, following penetrative brain injury of both mice and zebra finches, it has been shown to be expressed in astrocytes. It has also been shown to decrease apoptosis following brain injury in zebra finches. This is thought to be due to the neuroprotective actions of estrogens, including estradiol. Research has found that two pro-inflammatory cytokines, interleukin-1β (IL-1β) and interleukin-6 (IL-6), are responsible for the induction of aromatase expression in astrocytes following penetrative brain injury in the zebra finch.

== Disorders ==
=== Aromatase excess syndrome ===
A number of investigators have reported on a rather rare syndrome of excess aromatase activity. In boys, it creates gynecomastia, and in girls, precocious puberty and gigantomastia. In both sexes, early epiphyseal closure leads to short stature. This condition is due to mutations in the CYP19A1 gene which encodes aromatase. It is inherited in an autosomal dominant fashion. It has been suggested that the pharaoh Akhenaten and other members of his family may have had this disorder, but more recent genetic tests suggest otherwise. It is one of the causes of familial precocious puberty—a condition first described in 1937.

=== Aromatase deficiency syndrome ===
This syndrome is due to a loss of function mutation within the CYP19A1 gene and is inherited in an autosomal recessive way. Accumulations of androgens during pregnancy may lead to virilization of a female at birth (males are not affected). Females will have primary amenorrhea. Individuals of both sexes will be tall, as lack of estrogen prevents epiphyseal closure.

== Inhibition of aromatase ==
The following natural products have been found to have inhibiting effects on aromatase in vitro:

- Apigenin
- Catechin
- Chalcones
- Eriodictyol
- Hesperetin
- Isoliquiritigenin
- Mangostin
- Myosmine
- Nicotine
- Resveratrol
- Vitamin E
- Zinc salts
- Agaricus bisporus

=== Clinically used aromatase inhibitors ===
Aromatase inhibitors have become useful in the management of patients with breast cancer whose tumor was found to be estrogen receptor positive. Inhibitors that are in current clinical use include anastrozole, exemestane, and letrozole.

== See also ==
- Steroidogenic enzyme
