= Hormonal therapy (oncology) =

Hormone therapy for cancer

- Specialty: Oncology

Hormonal therapy in oncology is hormone therapy for cancer and is one of the major modalities of medical oncology (pharmacotherapy for cancer), others being cytotoxic chemotherapy and targeted therapy (biotherapeutics). It involves the manipulation of the endocrine system through exogenous or external administration of specific hormones, particularly steroid hormones, or drugs which inhibit the production or activity of such hormones (hormone antagonists). Because steroid hormones are powerful drivers of gene expression in certain cancer cells, changing the levels or activity of certain hormones can cause certain cancers to cease growing, or even undergo cell death. Surgical removal of endocrine organs, such as orchiectomy and oophorectomy can also be employed as a form of hormonal therapy.

Hormonal therapy is used for several types of cancers derived from hormonally responsive tissues, including the breast, prostate, endometrium, and adrenal cortex. Hormonal therapy may also be used in the treatment of paraneoplastic syndromes or to ameliorate certain cancer- and chemotherapy-associated symptoms, such as anorexia. Perhaps the most familiar example of hormonal therapy in oncology is the use of the selective estrogen-response modulator tamoxifen for the treatment of breast cancer, although another class of hormonal agents, aromatase inhibitors, now have an expanding role in that disease.

== Inhibitors of hormone synthesis ==
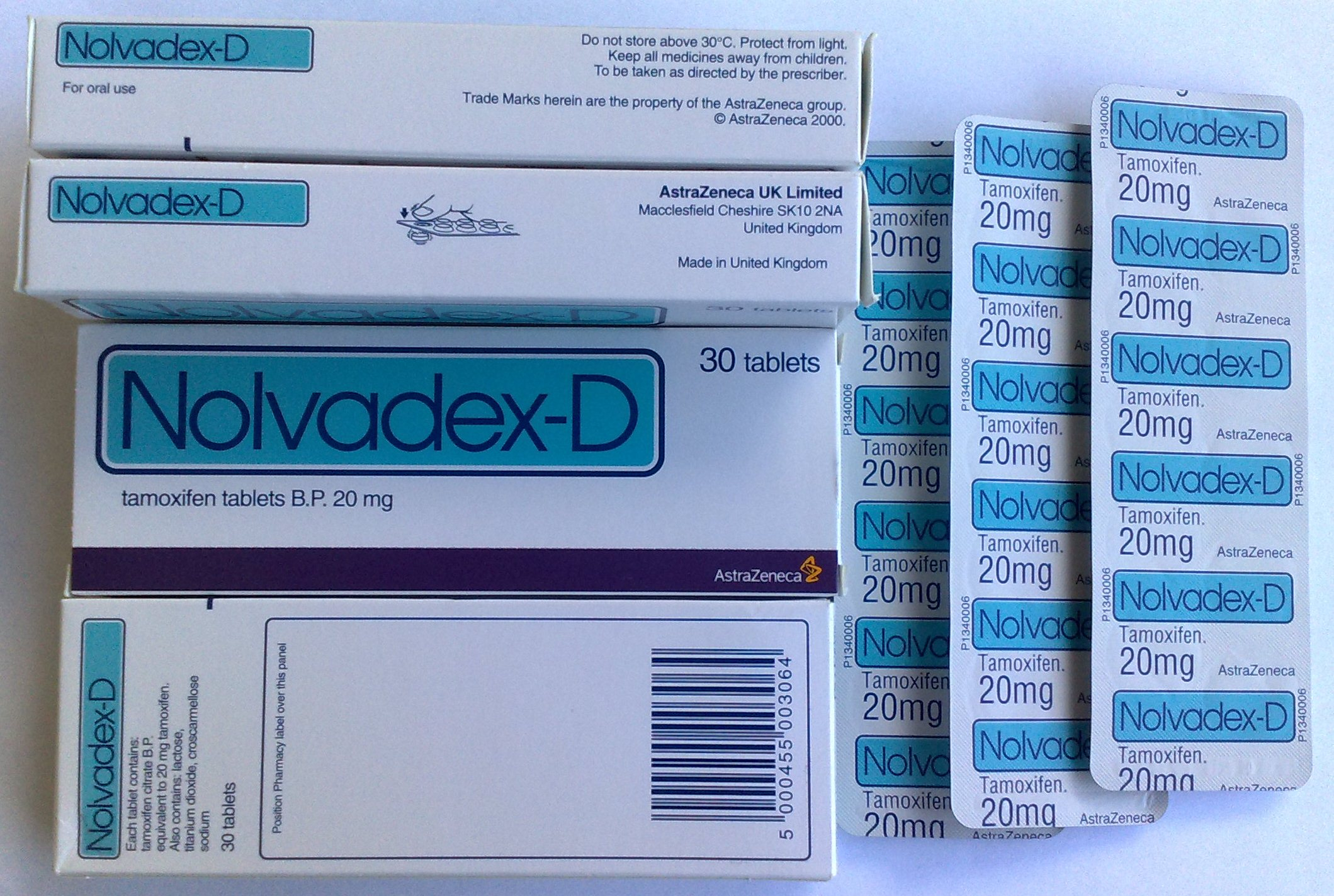
Nolvadex (tamoxifen) 20 mg tablets

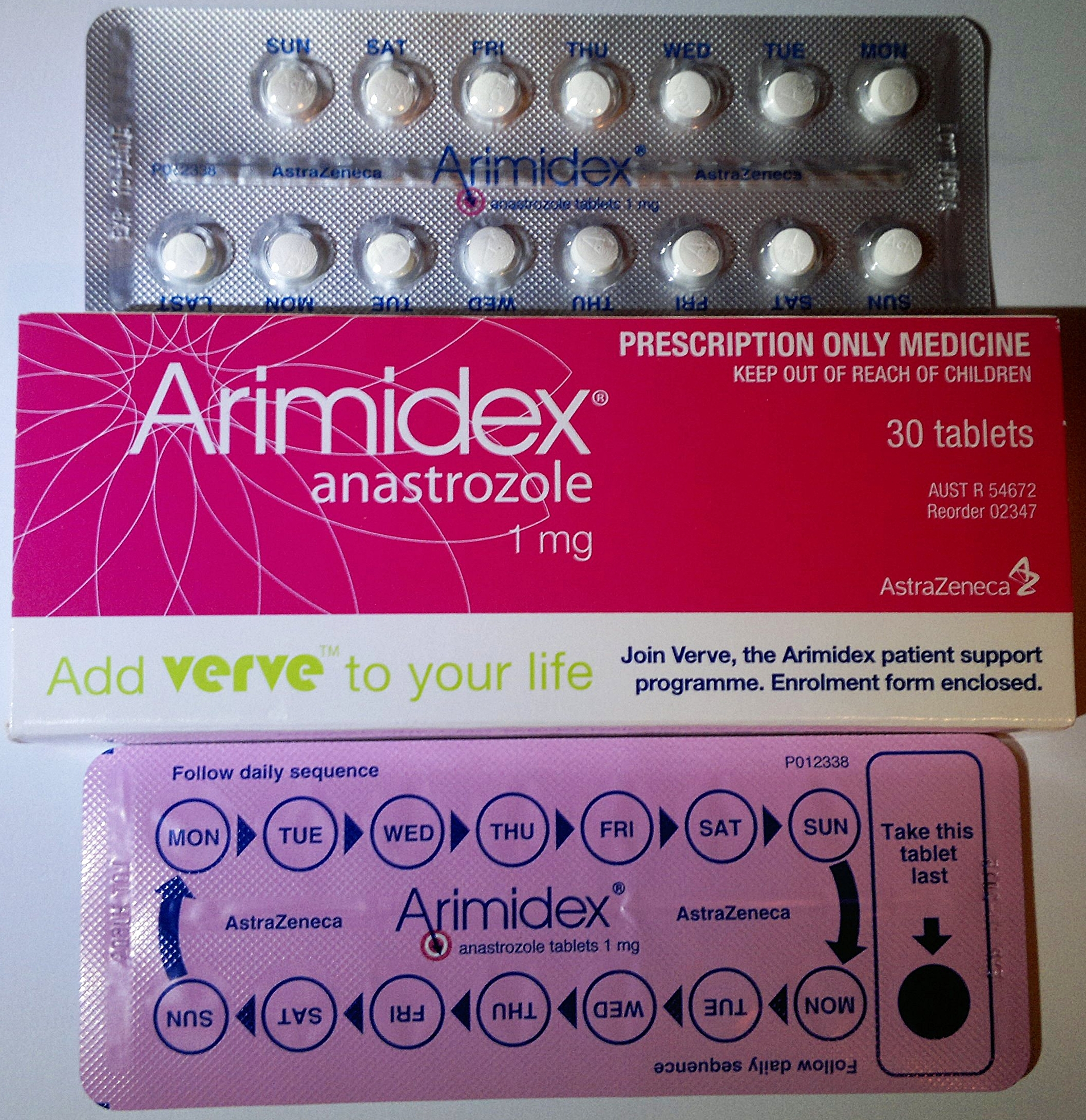
Arimidex (anastrozole) 1 mg tablets

One effective strategy for starving tumor cells of growth- and survival-promoting hormones is to use drugs which inhibit the production of those hormones in their organ of origin.

=== Aromatase inhibitors ===
Aromatase inhibitors are an important class of drugs used for the treatment of breast cancer in postmenopausal women. At menopause, estrogen production in the ovaries ceases, but other tissues continue to produce estrogen through the action of the enzyme aromatase on androgens produced by the adrenal glands. When the action of aromatase is blocked, estrogen levels in post-menopausal women can drop to extremely low levels, causing growth arrest and/or apoptosis of hormone-responsive cancer cells.

Letrozole

Letrozole and anastrozole are aromatase inhibitors which have been shown to be superior to tamoxifen for the first-line treatment of breast cancer in postmenopausal women. Exemestane is an irreversible "aromatase inactivator" which is superior to megestrol acetate for treatment of tamoxifen-refractory metastatic breast cancer, and does not appear to have the osteoporosis-promoting side effects of other drugs in this class.

Aminoglutethimide inhibits both aromatase and other enzymes critical for steroid hormone synthesis in the adrenal glands. It was formerly used for breast cancer treatment, but has since been replaced by more selective aromatase inhibitors. It can also be used for the treatment of hyperadrenocortical syndromes, such as Cushing's syndrome and hyperaldosteronism in adrenocortical carcinoma.

=== GnRH analogues ===
Analogs of gonadotropin-releasing hormone (GnRH) can be used to induce a chemical castration, that is, complete suppression of the production of estrogen and progesterone from the female ovaries, or complete suppression of testosterone production from the male testes. This is due to a negative feedback effect of continuous stimulation of the pituitary gland by these hormones. Leuprorelin and goserelin are GnRH analogs which are used primarily for the treatment of hormone-responsive prostate cancer. Because the initial endocrine response to GnRH analogs is actually hypersecretion of gonadal steroids, hormone receptor antagonists such as flutamide are typically used to prevent a transient boost in tumor growth.

== Hormone receptor antagonists ==
Hormone receptor antagonists bind to the normal receptor for a given hormone and prevent its activation. The target receptor may be on the cell surface, as in the case of peptide and glycoprotein hormones, or it may be intracellular, as in the case of steroid hormone receptors.

=== Selective estrogen receptor modulators ===
Tamoxifen

Selective estrogen receptor modulators (SERMs) are an important class of hormonal therapy agents which act as antagonists of the estrogen receptor and are used primarily for the treatment and chemoprevention of breast cancer. Some members of this family, such as tamoxifen, are actually partial agonists, which can actually increase estrogen receptor signalling in some tissues, such as the endometrium. Tamoxifen is currently first-line treatment for nearly all pre-menopausal women with hormone receptor-positive breast cancer. Raloxifene is another partial agonist SERM which does not seem to promote endometrial cancer, and is used primarily for chemoprevention of breast cancer in high-risk individuals, as well as to prevent osteoporosis. Toremifene and fulvestrant are SERMs with little or no agonist activity, and are used for treatment of metastatic breast cancer.

=== Antiandrogens ===
Antiandrogens are a class of drug which bind and inhibit the androgen receptor, blocking the growth- and survival-promoting effects of testosterone on certain prostate cancers. Flutamide and bicalutamide are antiandrogens which are frequently used in the treatment of prostate cancer, either as long-term monotherapy, or in the initial few weeks of GnRH analog therapy. (See also Androgen deprivation therapy)

== Hormone supplementation ==
Megestrol acetate

While most hormonal therapy strategies seek to block hormone signalling to cancer cells, there are some instances in which supplementation with specific hormone agonists may have a growth-inhibiting, or even cytotoxic effect on tumor cells. Because many hormones can produce antagonism and feedback inhibition of the synthesis of other hormones, there is significant overlap between this concept and those discussed above.

=== Progestogens ===
Progestins (progesterone-like drugs) such as megestrol acetate and medroxyprogesterone acetate have been used for the treatment of hormone-responsive, advanced breast cancer, endometrial cancer, and prostate cancer. Progestins are also used in the treatment of endometrial hyperplasia, a precursor to endometrial adenocarcinoma. The exact mechanism of action of these hormones is unclear, and may involve both direct effect on the tumor cells (suppression of estrogen receptor levels, alteration of hormone metabolism, direct cytotoxicity) and indirect endocrine effects (suppression of adrenal androgen production and plasma estrone sulfate formation).

=== Androgens ===
Fluoxymesterone, an anabolic steroid (testosterone-like) medication, is occasionally used for the treatment of advanced breast cancer. The mechanism of the anticancer effects of this androgen in breast cancer are unclear, but may be analogous to those of progestins.

=== Estrogens ===
The estrogen diethylstilbestrol (DES) is occasionally used to treat prostate cancer through suppression of testosterone production. It was previously used in the treatment of breast cancer, but has been replaced by more effective and less toxic agents. Estrace is an estrogen which was also formerly used for antiandrogen therapy of prostate cancer. Polyestradiol phosphate is a long-acting derivative of estradiol that is applied as an intramuscular injection.

Estrogen dosages for prostate cancer
Route/form	Estrogen	Dosage
Oral	Estradiol	1–2 mg 3x/day
Oral	Conjugated estrogens	1.25–2.5 mg 3x/day
Oral	Ethinylestradiol	0.15–3 mg/day
Oral	Ethinylestradiol sulfonate	1–2 mg 1x/week
Oral	Diethylstilbestrol	1–3 mg/day
Oral	Dienestrol	5 mg/day
Oral	Hexestrol	5 mg/day
Oral	Fosfestrol	100–480 mg 1–3x/day
Oral	Chlorotrianisene	12–48 mg/day
Oral	Quadrosilan	900 mg/day
Oral	Estramustine phosphate	140–1400 mg/day
Transdermal patch	Estradiol	2–6x 100 μg/day Scrotal: 1x 100 μg/day
IM or SC injection	Estradiol benzoate	1.66 mg 3x/week
IM or SC injection	Estradiol dipropionate	5 mg 1x/week
IM or SC injection	Estradiol valerate	10–40 mg 1x/1–2 weeks
IM or SC injection	Estradiol undecylate	100 mg 1x/4 weeks
IM or SC injection	Polyestradiol phosphate	Alone: 160–320 mg 1x/4 weeks With oral EE: 40–80 mg 1x/4 weeks
IM or SC injection	Estrone	2–4 mg 2–3x/week
IV injection	Fosfestrol	300–1200 mg 1–7x/week
IV injection	Estramustine phosphate	240–450 mg/day
Note: Dosages are not necessarily equivalent. Sources: See template.

=== Somatostatin analogs ===
Octreotide is an analog of the peptide hormone somatostatin, which inhibits the production of the growth hormone as well as numerous peptide hormones of the gastrointestinal system, including insulin, glucagon, pancreatic polypeptide, gastric inhibitory polypeptide, and gastrin. Octreotide is used for suppression of the hormonal syndromes which accompany several pancreatic islet cell tumors, including the Zollinger-Ellison syndrome of gastrinoma and the chronic hypoglycemia of insulinoma. It is also effective in suppression of the carcinoid syndrome, caused by advanced or extra-gastrointestinal carcinoid tumors. Octreotide may also be used for treatment of severe diarrhea caused by 5-fluorouracil chemotherapy or radiation therapy.

== Non-medical hormonal interventions ==
In addition to the use of medication to produce tumor-suppressing endocrine alterations, destruction of endocrine organs through surgery or radiation therapy are also possible. Surgical castration, or removal of the testes in males and ovaries in females, have been widely used in the past to treat hormone-responsive prostate cancer and breast cancer respectively. However, these invasive methods have been widely supplanted by the use of GnRH agonists, and other forms of pharmacologic castration.

There are still situations in which surgical castration may be beneficial such as in special cases for women with high risk BRCA mutations.

== Hormonal immunotherapy ==
For more information on this topic, see Immunotherapy

Hormonal stimulation of the immune system with interferons and cytokines has been used to treat specific cancers, including renal cell carcinoma and melanoma.

== See also ==
- List of hormonal cytostatic antineoplastic agents
- Antiestrogen withdrawal response
- Endocrine therapy resistance in breast cancer
