= Diethylstilbestrol dipropionate =

Chemical compound

Clinical data
- Other names: DESDP; Diethylstilbestrol dipropanoate; Stilboestrol dipropionate; Stilbestrol dipropionate
- Routes of administration: Intramuscular injection
- Drug class: Nonsteroidal estrogen; Estrogen ester

Identifiers
- IUPAC name: [4-[(E)-4-(4-propanoyloxyphenyl)hex-3-en-3-yl]phenyl] propanoate
- CAS Number: 130-80-3
- PubChem CID: 657220
- ChemSpider: 571380
- UNII: Y98CK3J0OL
- CompTox Dashboard (EPA): DTXSID7047146
- ECHA InfoCard: 100.004.543

Chemical and physical data
- Formula: C_{24}H_{28}O_{4}
- Molar mass: 380.484 g·mol^{−1}
- 3D model (JSmol): Interactive image
- SMILES: CCC(=O)Oc1ccc(cc1)\C(CC)=C(/CC)c2ccc(OC(=O)CC)cc2
- InChI: InChI=1S/C24H28O4/c1-5-21(17-9-13-19(14-10-17)27-23(25)7-3)22(6-2)18-11-15-20(16-12-18)28-24(26)8-4/h9-16H,5-8H2,1-4H3/b22-21+; Key:VZMLEMYJUIIHNF-QURGRASLSA-N

Diethylstilbestrol dipropionate (DESDP) (brand names Agostilben, Biokeral, Clinestrol, Cyclen, Estilbin, Estril, Neobenzoestrol, Orestol, Oroestrol, Ostregenin, Prostilbene, Stilbestriol DP, Stilboestrolum Dipropionicum, Stilboestrol, Synestrin, Willestrol, others), or diethylstilbestrol dipropanoate, also known as stilboestrol dipropionate (BANM), is a synthetic nonsteroidal estrogen of the stilbestrol group that was formerly marketed widely throughout Europe. It is an ester of diethylstilbestrol with propionic acid, and is more slowly absorbed in the body than diethylstilbestrol. The medication has been said to be one of the most potent estrogens known.

The medication has been available in both oral and intramuscular formulations.

Potencies of oral estrogens
Compound	Dosage for specific uses (mg usually) (Note: Dosages are given in milligrams unless otherwise noted.)					
Compound	ETD (Note: Dosed every 2 to 3 weeks)	EPD	MSD	MSD (Note: Dosed daily)	OID	TSD
Estradiol (non-micronized)	30	≥120–300	120	6	-	-
Estradiol (micronized)	6–12	60–80	14–42	1–2	>5	>8
Estradiol valerate	6–12	60–80	14–42	1–2	-	>8
Estradiol benzoate	-	60–140	-	-	-	-
Estriol	≥20	120–150 (Note: In divided doses, 3x/day; irregular and atypical proliferation.)	28–126	1–6	>5	-
Estriol succinate	-	140–150	28–126	2–6	-	-
Estrone sulfate	12	60	42	2	-	-
Conjugated estrogens	5–12	60–80	8.4–25	0.625–1.25	>3.75	7.5
Ethinylestradiol	200 μg	1–2	280 μg	20–40 μg	100 μg	100 μg
Mestranol	300 μg	1.5–3.0	300–600 μg	25–30 μg	>80 μg	-
Quinestrol	300 μg	2–4	500 μg	25–50 μg	-	-
Methylestradiol	-	2	-	-	-	-
Diethylstilbestrol	2.5	20–30	11	0.5–2.0	>5	3
DES dipropionate	-	15–30	-	-	-	-
Dienestrol	5	30–40	42	0.5–4.0	-	-
Dienestrol diacetate	3–5	30–60	-	-	-	-
Hexestrol	-	70–110	-	-	-	-
Chlorotrianisene	-	>100	-	-	>48	-
Methallenestril	-	400	-	-	-	-
Sources and footnotes:

Parenteral potencies and durations of nonsteroidal estrogens
Estrogen	Form	Major brand name(s)	EPD (14 days)	Duration
Diethylstilbestrol (DES)	Oil solution	Metestrol	20 mg	1 mg ≈ 2–3 days; 3 mg ≈ 3 days
Diethylstilbestrol dipropionate	Oil solution	Cyren B	12.5–15 mg	2.5 mg ≈ 5 days
Diethylstilbestrol dipropionate	Aqueous suspension	?	5 mg	? mg = 21–28 days
Dimestrol (DES dimethyl ether)	Oil solution	Depot-Cyren, Depot-Oestromon, Retalon Retard	20–40 mg	?
Fosfestrol (DES diphosphate)^{a}	Aqueous solution	Honvan	?	<1 day
Dienestrol diacetate	Aqueous suspension	Farmacyrol-Kristallsuspension	50 mg	?
Hexestrol dipropionate	Oil solution	Hormoestrol, Retalon Oleosum	25 mg	?
Hexestrol diphosphate^{a}	Aqueous solution	Cytostesin, Pharmestrin, Retalon Aquosum	?	Very short
Note: All by intramuscular injection unless otherwise noted. Footnotes: ^{a} = By intravenous injection. Sources: See template.

== See also ==
- List of estrogen esters § Diethylstilbestrol esters
- List of sex-hormonal aqueous suspensions
