= Dienestrol diacetate =

Chemical compound

Clinical data
- Trade names: Faragynol, Gynocyrol
- Other names: Dienestrol acetate; Lipamone
- Drug class: Nonsteroidal estrogen; Estrogen ester

Identifiers
- IUPAC name: [4-[(2Z,4E)-4-(4-acetyloxyphenyl)hexa-2,4-dien-3-yl]phenyl] acetate
- CAS Number: 24705-61-1; ACI: 84-19-5
- PubChem CID: 24884313
- DrugBank: DB14668
- ChemSpider: 4707742
- UNII: D20D148WPQ; ACI: D20D148WPQ
- ChEMBL: ChEMBL3188355
- CompTox Dashboard (EPA): DTXSID9057840

Chemical and physical data
- Formula: C_{22}H_{22}O_{4}
- Molar mass: 350.414 g·mol^{−1}
- 3D model (JSmol): Interactive image
- SMILES: C\C=C(c1ccc(OC(C)=O)cc1)/C(=C/C)c2ccc(OC(C)=O)cc2
- InChI: InChI=1S/C22H22O4/c1-5-21(17-7-11-19(12-8-17)25-15(3)23)22(6-2)18-9-13-20(14-10-18)26-16(4)24/h5-14H,1-4H3/b21-5-,22-6+; Key:YWLLGDVBTLPARJ-LWKKFVLGSA-N

Dienestrol diacetate (brand names Faragynol, Gynocyrol, others) is a synthetic nonsteroidal estrogen of the stilbestrol group related to diethylstilbestrol. It is an ester of dienestrol.

Potencies of oral estrogens
Compound	Dosage for specific uses (mg usually) (Note: Dosages are given in milligrams unless otherwise noted.)					
Compound	ETD (Note: Dosed every 2 to 3 weeks)	EPD	MSD	MSD (Note: Dosed daily)	OID	TSD
Estradiol (non-micronized)	30	≥120–300	120	6	-	-
Estradiol (micronized)	6–12	60–80	14–42	1–2	>5	>8
Estradiol valerate	6–12	60–80	14–42	1–2	-	>8
Estradiol benzoate	-	60–140	-	-	-	-
Estriol	≥20	120–150 (Note: In divided doses, 3x/day; irregular and atypical proliferation.)	28–126	1–6	>5	-
Estriol succinate	-	140–150	28–126	2–6	-	-
Estrone sulfate	12	60	42	2	-	-
Conjugated estrogens	5–12	60–80	8.4–25	0.625–1.25	>3.75	7.5
Ethinylestradiol	200 μg	1–2	280 μg	20–40 μg	100 μg	100 μg
Mestranol	300 μg	1.5–3.0	300–600 μg	25–30 μg	>80 μg	-
Quinestrol	300 μg	2–4	500 μg	25–50 μg	-	-
Methylestradiol	-	2	-	-	-	-
Diethylstilbestrol	2.5	20–30	11	0.5–2.0	>5	3
DES dipropionate	-	15–30	-	-	-	-
Dienestrol	5	30–40	42	0.5–4.0	-	-
Dienestrol diacetate	3–5	30–60	-	-	-	-
Hexestrol	-	70–110	-	-	-	-
Chlorotrianisene	-	>100	-	-	>48	-
Methallenestril	-	400	-	-	-	-
Sources and footnotes:

Parenteral potencies and durations of nonsteroidal estrogens
Estrogen	Form	Major brand name(s)	EPD (14 days)	Duration
Diethylstilbestrol (DES)	Oil solution	Metestrol	20 mg	1 mg ≈ 2–3 days; 3 mg ≈ 3 days
Diethylstilbestrol dipropionate	Oil solution	Cyren B	12.5–15 mg	2.5 mg ≈ 5 days
Diethylstilbestrol dipropionate	Aqueous suspension	?	5 mg	? mg = 21–28 days
Dimestrol (DES dimethyl ether)	Oil solution	Depot-Cyren, Depot-Oestromon, Retalon Retard	20–40 mg	?
Fosfestrol (DES diphosphate)^{a}	Aqueous solution	Honvan	?	<1 day
Dienestrol diacetate	Aqueous suspension	Farmacyrol-Kristallsuspension	50 mg	?
Hexestrol dipropionate	Oil solution	Hormoestrol, Retalon Oleosum	25 mg	?
Hexestrol diphosphate^{a}	Aqueous solution	Cytostesin, Pharmestrin, Retalon Aquosum	?	Very short
Note: All by intramuscular injection unless otherwise noted. Footnotes: ^{a} = By intravenous injection. Sources: See template.

== See also ==
- List of estrogen esters § Esters of other nonsteroidal estrogens
- List of sex-hormonal aqueous suspensions
