= Hexestrol dicaprylate =

Chemical compound

Identifiers
- IUPAC name: [4-[4-(4-Octanoyloxyphenyl)hexan-3-yl]phenyl] octanoate
- CAS Number: 20305-51-5
- PubChem CID: 161308
- ChemSpider: 141698
- UNII: J9DFR4IT9Z
- CompTox Dashboard (EPA): DTXSID50942446

Chemical and physical data
- Formula: C_{34}H_{50}O_{4}
- Molar mass: 522.770 g·mol^{−1}
- 3D model (JSmol): Interactive image
- SMILES: CCCCCCCC(=O)OC1=CC=C(C=C1)C(CC)C(CC)C2=CC=C(C=C2)OC(=O)CCCCCCC
- InChI: InChI=InChI=1S/C34H50O4/c1-5-9-11-13-15-17-33(35)37-29-23-19-27(20-24-29)31(7-3)32(8-4)28-21-25-30(26-22-28)38-34(36)18-16-14-12-10-6-2/h19-26,31-32H,5-18H2,1-4H3; Key:JZMCTYYCJNIOBO-UHFFFAOYSA-N

Hexestrol dicaprylate (brand name Taston), or dioctanoylhexestrol, is a synthetic, nonsteroidal estrogen of the stilbestrol group related to diethylstilbestrol that is no longer marketed. It is a long-acting ester of hexestrol.

== See also ==
- Hexestrol diacetate
- Hexestrol diphosphate
- Hexestrol dipropionate
