= Hexestrol =

Chemical compound

Clinical data
- Trade names: Synestrol, Synoestrol, Estrifar, Estronal
- Other names: Hexoestrol; Hexanestrol; Hexanoestrol; Dihydrodiethylstilbestrol; Dihydrostilbestrol; 4,4'-(1,2-Diethylethylene)diphenol; NSC-9894
- Routes of administration: By mouth, intramuscular injection (as an ester)
- Drug class: Nonsteroidal estrogen

Identifiers
- IUPAC name: 4-[4-(4-Hydroxyphenyl)hexan-3-yl]phenol
- CAS Number: 84-16-2
- PubChem CID: 3606
- IUPHAR/BPS: 2823
- DrugBank: DB07931
- ChemSpider: 3480
- UNII: 10BI795R7D
- KEGG: D01641
- ChEBI: CHEBI:31669
- ChEMBL: ChEMBL6615
- CompTox Dashboard (EPA): DTXSID2022381
- ECHA InfoCard: 100.001.380

Chemical and physical data
- Formula: C_{18}H_{22}O_{2}
- Molar mass: 270.372 g·mol^{−1}
- 3D model (JSmol): Interactive image
- SMILES: CCC(C1=CC=C(C=C1)O)C(CC)C2=CC=C(C=C2)O
- InChI: InChI=1S/C18H22O2/c1-3-17(13-5-9-15(19)10-6-13)18(4-2)14-7-11-16(20)12-8-14/h5-12,17-20H,3-4H2,1-2H3; Key:PBBGSZCBWVPOOL-UHFFFAOYSA-N

Hexestrol, sold under the brand name Synestrol among others, is a nonsteroidal estrogen which was previously used for estrogen replacement therapy and in the treatment of certain hormone-dependent cancers as well as gynecological disorders but is mostly no longer marketed. It has also been used in the form of esters such as hexestrol diacetate (brand name Sintestrol) and hexestrol dipropionate (brand name Hexanoestrol). Hexestrol and its esters are taken by mouth, held under the tongue, or via injection into muscle.

== Medical uses ==
Hexestrol has been used in estrogen replacement therapy, for the treatment of breast cancer in women and prostate cancer in men, and for the treatment of certain gynecological disorders.

Estrogen dosages for prostate cancer
Route/form	Estrogen	Dosage
Oral	Estradiol	1–2 mg 3x/day
Oral	Conjugated estrogens	1.25–2.5 mg 3x/day
Oral	Ethinylestradiol	0.15–3 mg/day
Oral	Ethinylestradiol sulfonate	1–2 mg 1x/week
Oral	Diethylstilbestrol	1–3 mg/day
Oral	Dienestrol	5 mg/day
Oral	Hexestrol	5 mg/day
Oral	Fosfestrol	100–480 mg 1–3x/day
Oral	Chlorotrianisene	12–48 mg/day
Oral	Quadrosilan	900 mg/day
Oral	Estramustine phosphate	140–1400 mg/day
Transdermal patch	Estradiol	2–6x 100 μg/day Scrotal: 1x 100 μg/day
IM or SC injection	Estradiol benzoate	1.66 mg 3x/week
IM or SC injection	Estradiol dipropionate	5 mg 1x/week
IM or SC injection	Estradiol valerate	10–40 mg 1x/1–2 weeks
IM or SC injection	Estradiol undecylate	100 mg 1x/4 weeks
IM or SC injection	Polyestradiol phosphate	Alone: 160–320 mg 1x/4 weeks With oral EE: 40–80 mg 1x/4 weeks
IM or SC injection	Estrone	2–4 mg 2–3x/week
IV injection	Fosfestrol	300–1200 mg 1–7x/week
IV injection	Estramustine phosphate	240–450 mg/day
Note: Dosages are not necessarily equivalent. Sources: See template.

== Pharmacology ==
=== Pharmacodynamics ===
Hexestrol has approximately 302% and 234% of the affinity of estradiol for the estrogen receptors (ERs) ERα and ERβ, respectively. The affinity of hexestrol for the ERs is said to be similar to or slightly higher than that of estradiol. Along with diethylstilbestrol, hexestrol has been said to be one of the most potent estrogens known. The total endometrial proliferation dose per cycle of different forms of hexestrol are 70 to 100 mg for oral hexestrol, 45 mg for sublingual hexestrol diacetate, and 25 mg for hexestrol dipropionate by intramuscular injection. These doses are fairly similar to those of estradiol and its esters. Hexestrol induces mammary gland development in rodents similarly to other estrogens.

Nonsteroidal estrogens like diethylstilbestrol, which is closely related structurally to hexestrol, are known to have dramatically disproportionate estrogenic effects in the liver and on liver protein synthesis.

Parenteral potencies and durations of nonsteroidal estrogens
Estrogen	Form	Major brand name(s)	EPD (14 days)	Duration
Diethylstilbestrol (DES)	Oil solution	Metestrol	20 mg	1 mg ≈ 2–3 days; 3 mg ≈ 3 days
Diethylstilbestrol dipropionate	Oil solution	Cyren B	12.5–15 mg	2.5 mg ≈ 5 days
Diethylstilbestrol dipropionate	Aqueous suspension	?	5 mg	? mg = 21–28 days
Dimestrol (DES dimethyl ether)	Oil solution	Depot-Cyren, Depot-Oestromon, Retalon Retard	20–40 mg	?
Fosfestrol (DES diphosphate)^{a}	Aqueous solution	Honvan	?	<1 day
Dienestrol diacetate	Aqueous suspension	Farmacyrol-Kristallsuspension	50 mg	?
Hexestrol dipropionate	Oil solution	Hormoestrol, Retalon Oleosum	25 mg	?
Hexestrol diphosphate^{a}	Aqueous solution	Cytostesin, Pharmestrin, Retalon Aquosum	?	Very short
Note: All by intramuscular injection unless otherwise noted. Footnotes: ^{a} = By intravenous injection. Sources: See template.

=== Pharmacokinetics ===
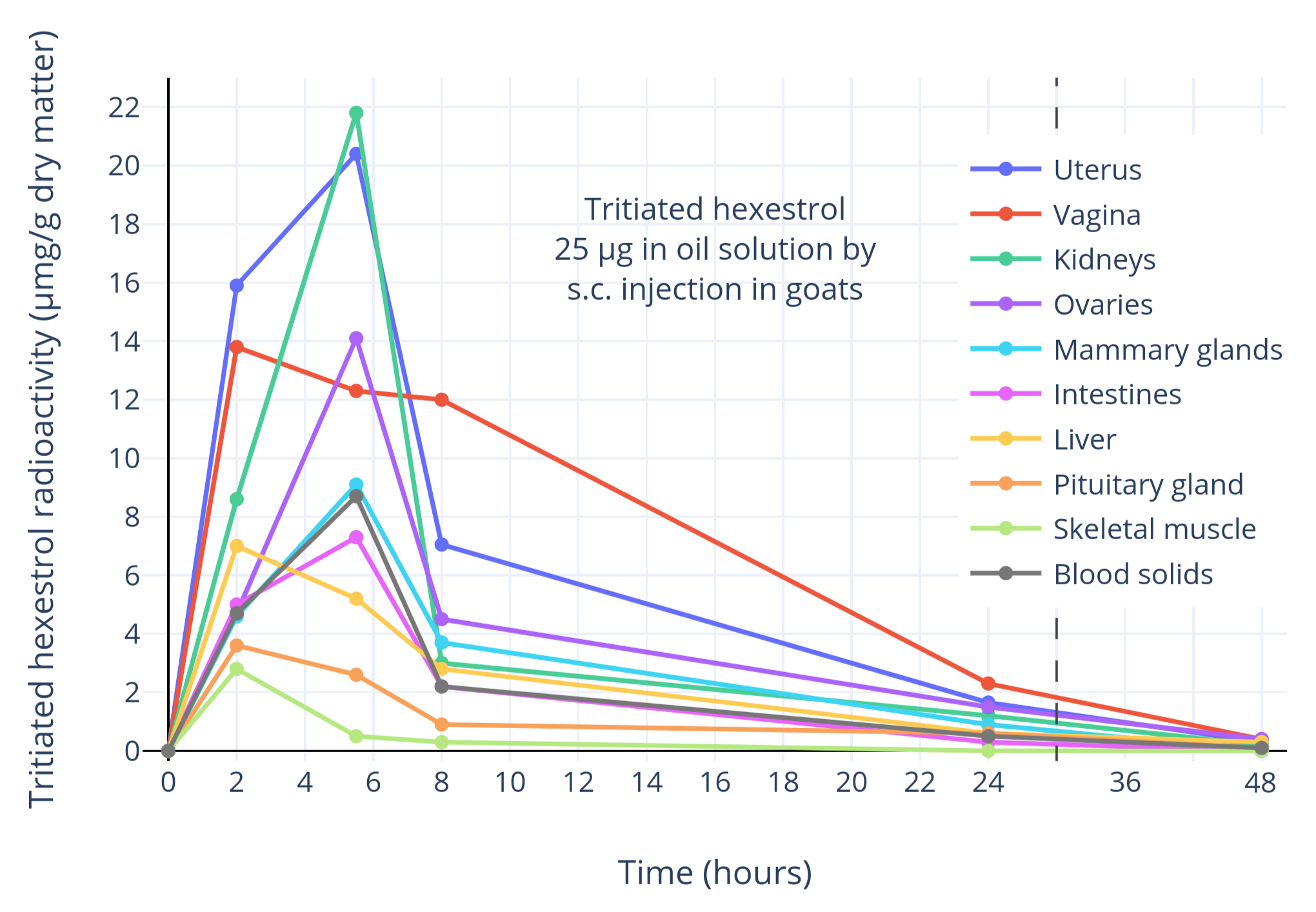
Distribution of hexestrol radioactivity in blood and tissues after a subcutaneous injection of a physiological dose of tritium-labeled hexestrol in oil solution in five juvenile female goats. Points are one animal each. With the exception of skeletal muscle, tissues with a radioactivity concentration of less than 15% of that of the endometrium are not shown. Hexestrol is concentrated in target tissues such as the uterus and vagina due to binding to estrogen receptors.

The pharmacokinetics and distribution of hexestrol have been studied with intravenous injection of aqueous solution in women and with subcutaneous injection of oil solution in female goats and sheep.

== Chemistry ==
Hexestrol, also known as dihydrodiethylstilbestrol, is a synthetic nonsteroidal estrogen of the stilbestrol group related to diethylstilbestrol. Esters of hexestrol include hexestrol diacetate, hexestrol dicaprylate, hexestrol diphosphate, and hexestrol dipropionate.

== History ==
Hexestrol was first described by Campbell, Dodds, and Lawson in 1938. It was isolated from the demethylation products of anethole.

== Society and culture ==
=== Generic names ===
Hexestrol is the generic name of the drug and its INN.

=== Brand names ===
Hexestrol has been marketed under a variety of brand names including Synestrol, Synoestrol, Estrifar, and Estronal, among others.

=== Availability ===
Hexestrol has mostly been discontinued and remains available in only a handful of countries. Esters of hexestrol which have been marketed include hexestrol diacetate, hexestrol dicaprylate, hexestrol diphosphate, and hexestrol dipropionate.
