= Hexestrol dipropionate =

Chemical compound

Clinical data
- Other names: Hexestrol 4,4'-dipropionate

Identifiers
- IUPAC name: [4-[4-(4-propanoyloxyphenyl)hexan-3-yl]phenyl] propanoate
- CAS Number: 4825-53-0
- PubChem CID: 107342
- ChemSpider: 96605
- UNII: 87WC4ICV8O
- ChEMBL: ChEMBL1577591
- CompTox Dashboard (EPA): DTXSID40964036

Chemical and physical data
- Formula: C_{24}H_{30}O_{4}
- Molar mass: 382.500 g·mol^{−1}
- 3D model (JSmol): Interactive image
- SMILES: CCC(C1=CC=C(C=C1)OC(=O)CC)C(CC)C2=CC=C(C=C2)OC(=O)CC
- InChI: InChI=1S/C24H30O4/c1-5-21(17-9-13-19(14-10-17)27-23(25)7-3)22(6-2)18-11-15-20(16-12-18)28-24(26)8-4/h9-16,21-22H,5-8H2,1-4H3; Key:HZLYMVNJKHJFRO-UHFFFAOYSA-N

Hexestrol dipropionate (brand name Hexanoestrol, Retalon Oleosum), or hexestrol dipropanoate, is a synthetic, nonsteroidal estrogen of the stilbestrol group related to diethylstilbestrol. It is an ester of hexestrol, and has been known since at least 1931. The drug has been used in the past to inhibit lactation in women.

Parenteral potencies and durations of nonsteroidal estrogens
Estrogen	Form	Major brand name(s)	EPD (14 days)	Duration
Diethylstilbestrol (DES)	Oil solution	Metestrol	20 mg	1 mg ≈ 2–3 days; 3 mg ≈ 3 days
Diethylstilbestrol dipropionate	Oil solution	Cyren B	12.5–15 mg	2.5 mg ≈ 5 days
Diethylstilbestrol dipropionate	Aqueous suspension	?	5 mg	? mg = 21–28 days
Dimestrol (DES dimethyl ether)	Oil solution	Depot-Cyren, Depot-Oestromon, Retalon Retard	20–40 mg	?
Fosfestrol (DES diphosphate)^{a}	Aqueous solution	Honvan	?	<1 day
Dienestrol diacetate	Aqueous suspension	Farmacyrol-Kristallsuspension	50 mg	?
Hexestrol dipropionate	Oil solution	Hormoestrol, Retalon Oleosum	25 mg	?
Hexestrol diphosphate^{a}	Aqueous solution	Cytostesin, Pharmestrin, Retalon Aquosum	?	Very short
Note: All by intramuscular injection unless otherwise noted. Footnotes: ^{a} = By intravenous injection. Sources: See template.

== See also ==
- Hexestrol diacetate
- Hexestrol dicaprylate
- Hexestrol diphosphate
