= Hexestrol diacetate =

Chemical compound

Identifiers
- IUPAC name: [4-[(3S,4R)-4-(4-acetyloxyphenyl)hexan-3-yl]phenyl] acetate
- CAS Number: 4547-76-6
- PubChem CID: 656653
- ChemSpider: 571002
- UNII: 0432698UA0
- KEGG: D02018

Chemical and physical data
- Formula: C_{22}H_{26}O_{4}
- Molar mass: 354.446 g·mol^{−1}
- 3D model (JSmol): Interactive image
- SMILES: CCC(C1=CC=C(C=C1)OC(=O)C)C(CC)C2=CC=C(C=C2)OC(=O)C
- InChI: InChI=1S/C22H26O4/c1-5-21(17-7-11-19(12-8-17)25-15(3)23)22(6-2)18-9-13-20(14-10-18)26-16(4)24/h7-14,21-22H,5-6H2,1-4H3/t21-,22+; Key:GWEREDCWIUZACS-SZPZYZBQSA-N

Hexestrol diacetate (JAN) (brand names Retalon Lingual, Robal, Sintestrol, Sintofolin) is a synthetic, nonsteroidal estrogen of the stilbestrol group related to diethylstilbestrol. It is an ester of hexestrol, and was discovered in 1939.

== See also ==
- Hexestrol dicaprylate
- Hexestrol diphosphate
- Hexestrol dipropionate
