= C20H24O2 =

The molecular formula C_{20}H_{24}O_{2} (molar mass: 296.40 g/mol, exact mass: 296.1776 u) may refer to:

- Dimestrol, or dianisylhexene
- Ethinylestradiol (EE)
- Exemestane
