= Metallibure =

Chemical compound

Clinical data
- Trade names: Aimax, Suisynchron, Turisynchron
- Other names: Methallibure; Methallibur; ICI-33828; AY-61122; NSC-69536
- Drug class: Antigonadotropin

Identifiers
- IUPAC name: 1-But-3-en-2-yl-3-(methylcarbamothioylamino)thiourea
- CAS Number: 926-93-2
- PubChem CID: 3003791
- ChemSpider: 2274191
- UNII: MBU5XJ97C4
- CompTox Dashboard (EPA): DTXSID70862475
- ECHA InfoCard: 100.011.952

Chemical and physical data
- Formula: C_{7}H_{14}N_{4}S_{2}
- Molar mass: 218.34 g·mol^{−1}
- 3D model (JSmol): Interactive image
- SMILES: CC(C=C)NC(=S)NNC(=S)NC
- InChI: InChI=1S/C7H14N4S2/c1-4-5(2)9-7(13)11-10-6(12)8-3/h4-5H,1H2,2-3H3,(H2,8,10,12)(H2,9,11,13); Key:CGFFKDRVHZIQHL-UHFFFAOYSA-N

Metallibure (INN; also known as methallibure (USAN, BAN) or methallibur (German); brand names Aimax, Suisynchron, Turisynchron; former developmental codes ICI-33828, AY-61122, NSC-69536) is a medication which was introduced in 1973 and has been used in veterinary medicine to synchronize estrus. It was withdrawn in the United States and Europe due to teratogenicity and has been replaced with altrenogest (Regumate, Matrix), a progestin.

The precise mechanism of action of metallibure is unknown. It has been described as a "nonsteroidal antigonadotropin" and it appears to act directly on the pituitary gland and/or hypothalamus to suppress gonadotropin secretion. However, metallibure has also been reported to be an antiprogestogen and to act specifically via inhibition of the biosynthesis or secretion of progesterone.

Metallibure has similar endocrinological effects in women. It is associated with several unpleasant side effects including appetite loss, nausea, occasional vomiting, lethargy, and drowsiness. Animal toxicity studies revealed that the medication induced the development of cataracts, and this resulted in the termination of its clinical development.

== See also ==
- Bifluranol
- Paroxypropione
- Quadrosilan
