= Endocrine therapy resistance in breast cancer =

Endocrine therapy is a common treatment for estrogen receptor positive breast cancer. However, resistance to this therapy can develop, leading to relapse and progression of disease. This highlights the need for new strategies to combat this resistance.

== Breast cancer overview ==
=== Hormonal status in breast cancer ===
Globally, breast cancer is the second most common type of cancer, comprising 11.6% of total worldwide cancer cases in 2018. In the United Kingdom, breast cancer is the most common cancer type, affecting around 1 in 8 women. It can be loosely divided into non-invasive, where the cancer is localized to the ducts or lobules in which it originated (in-situ), or invasive, where the cancer cells have spread beyond the initial duct or lobule into the surrounding breast tissue or other part of the body. Risk factors that may predispose to breast cancer include increasing age and a family history of breast cancer. Despite the increase in incidence of breast cancer with age, there is a notable deceleration of this increase following menopause. Moreover, breast cancer risk is heightened following use of the combined oral contraceptive pill and combined hormone replacement therapy. Armed with this evidence that endogenous and exogenous changes in estrogen and progesterone levels modulate the risk of breast cancer, it is apparent that hormones can play a key role in breast cancer.

Indeed, breast tumors can express certain hormone receptors, and use these to grow and proliferate. These hormone receptors (HR) are the estrogen receptor (ER) and the progesterone receptor (PR). Immunohistochemical analysis of a tumor sample, taken via biopsy or after surgery, is utilized to determine the presence of these receptors. To classify a tumor as ER or PR negative or positive, the Allred score is utilized, which takes into account both the proportion of ERs and PRs present and the overall intensity score of the staining - this method is considered controversial, however.

Another receptor that often plays a role in breast cancer, although it is not a hormone receptor, is the human epidermal growth factor receptor 2 (HER2). The overexpression of HER2 is determined by immunohistochemistry (IHC), or with fluorescent in situ hybridization in those equivocal cases where IHC does not provide a clear result.

Different molecular subtypes of breast cancer have also been described, which loosely align with receptor status:

- Luminal A (ER and/or PR positive; HER2 negative)
- Luminal B (ER and/or PR positive; HER2 positive)
- HER2-enriched (ER/PR negative; HER2 positive)
- Basal like (triple negative).

Additionally, cancers can be ER-/PR+ or ER+/PR-, but these are unnamed and relatively rare. The receptor status of a cancer is assessed for all breast cancers as it has important implications on prognosis of the patient. It also dictates the treatment given: cancers that do express ER are likely to respond to endocrine therapy, but this type of therapy will have no effect on triple-negative breast cancers.

=== Mechanism of estrogen receptor action ===
75% of breast cancers are ER+. ER is a transcription factor containing a DNA-binding domain which allows binding DNA at specific sequences called estrogen response elements (EREs), defined as 5’-GGTCAnnnTGACC-3’, where "n" refers to any nucleotide. The N-terminal of the ER holds the activation function 1 (AF1) domain; the AF2 domain of the ER is contained within the ligand binding domain. The AF2 domain contains binding sites for coactivators.

Estrogen is a steroid hormone and can cross the cell membrane freely. It can then bind to an ER, which is located in the cytoplasm of the cell. Upon binding, the ligand-receptor complex dimerizes with another, and this homodimer moves into the nucleus. Binding of an estrogen ligand exposes a site on the AF2 domain for coactivators to attach to the ER. By recruiting coactivators and transcription factors, transcription of downstream genes, referred to as estrogen responsive genes, is initiated. These genes are of diverse function, but may potentiate aberrant cell survival and proliferation, contributing to tumorigenesis and cancer progression. For example, the ER can promote transcription of cyclin D1, an important regulator of the cell cycle. By interfering with the expression of this regulator, estrogen and estrogen receptor signaling can disrupt the cell cycle.

Endocrine therapies interrupt this pathway, blocking the binding of the receptor to the response element and subsequent transcription of these estrogen-responsive genes. ER+/PR+ cancers have been found to show better results with administration of SERMs than ER+/PR- cancers. This trend has been found with AI therapy also, albeit in fewer studies. The biological basis of this remains unknown.

== Endocrine therapy overview ==
=== Estrogen ===
Estrogens are responsible for the regulation of the female reproductive system and development of secondary sexual characteristics.

17β-Estradiol is the biologically active form of the sex hormone known as estrogen. It is secreted by granulose cells of the ovarian follicle and the corpus luteum, and is the primary form of circulating form of estrogen.

Other forms of endogenous estrogen exist, such as estrone, estriol and estetrol. Estetrol and estriol are primarily found in the body during pregnancy, and estrone is present during the menopause.

All of the forms of estrogen found in the human body are able to bind to estrogen receptors (ER) present on cells. This initiates transcription in these cells, resulting in control of gene expression.

Treatment strategies that work by blocking the effect of estrogen on breast cancer are referred to as endocrine (or hormone) therapies. These can target hormone regulation in two distinct ways.

=== Blocking estrogen synthesis ===
Firstly, some forms of endocrine therapy can be administered to block estrogen synthesis. In pre-menopausal women, this can be achieved through surgical ovarian ablation (by oophorectomy) or chemical ovarian suppression (using luteinizing hormone releasing hormone agonists, such as goserelin). In postmenopausal women, the ovaries cease to be the main source of estrogen production, with estrogen being instead synthesized from regulatory steroid hormones called androgens in tissues of the bone, fat, and breast through the activity of the enzyme aromatase. This can be blocked through the administration of aromatase inhibitors (AIs), which can be reversible inhibitors (non-steroidal) such as anastrozole and letrozole, or irreversible (steroidal) inhibitors like exemestane.

=== Influencing the effect of estrogen ===
Secondly, other endocrine therapies can directly influence the effect of estrogen in cancer cells. ER function can be chemically blocked in pre- and post-menopausal women using antiestrogens, including:

- Selective ER modulators (SERMs), like tamoxifen. SERMs act as partial estrogen agonists, competing with estrogen to bind ER.
- Selective ER degraders or down-regulators (SERDs), like fulvestrant. SERDs that act as full estrogen antagonists, binding to ER and leading to its degradation.

== Endocrine resistance overview ==
=== Definition of endocrine resistance ===
The term endocrine resistance describes a resistance to estrogen signaling suppression. However, in many scientific studies endocrine resistance refers to resistance to estrogen or estrogen receptor suppression. This resistance occurs due to the development of escape pathways which provide new ways for cancer cells to survive in the presence of endocrine therapy. If a patient with ER+ breast cancer develops endocrine resistance, the endocrine therapy used to treat the cancer will no longer be effective. Approximately 30-50% of ER+ breast cancer patients will relapse as a result of endocrine resistance, proving it to be a predominant challenge in the treatment of ER+ breast cancer patients.

=== Types of endocrine resistance ===
There are two types of endocrine resistance: primary and secondary. Primary resistance can also be described as de novo resistance or intrinsic resistance, which means the resistance existed before any treatment was initiated. Secondary resistance is acquired, meaning that it occurs after some initial response to treatment due to exposure to endocrine therapy.

=== Characterization of endocrine resistance ===
The table below summarizes how the two types of resistance are characterized in clinical settings.

Type of resistance	Description	Relapse	Progressive disease	Response to further treatment
Primary.	De novo.	During first 2 years of adjuvant endocrine therapy.	Within the first 6 months of first-line endocrine therapy for metastatic breast cancer.	No response to subsequent endocrine therapy.
Secondary.	Acquired.	After the first 2 years of treatment, during adjuvant endocrine therapy. OR Within 1 year of finishing adjuvant endocrine therapy.	6 or more months after starting endocrine therapy.	Shorter stages of response to a series of endocrine therapies until there is then no further response to endocrine treatment.

=== Implications of resistance ===
Endocrine resistance in breast cancer leads to the progression of the disease and relapse. Resistance to endocrine therapy, leading to metastasis (spread of cancer beyond its place of origin) of breast cancer, which is one of the main reasons for death in breast cancer patients. This highlights the need for new strategies to overcome endocrine resistance and better treat ER+ breast cancer.

== Endocrine resistance mechanisms ==
=== ESR1 Modifications ===
Mutations in the ESR1 gene have been associated with the development of resistance to endocrine therapy. The ESR1 gene codes for estrogen receptors (ERα and ERβ). Whilst it is still not fully understood how ERβ impacts breast cancer development, ERα is known to have a role in tumor growth and cell survival.

Missense mutations, which are small mutations within a gene that can change the resulting protein, can lead to estrogen independence. This means that endocrine therapies blocking estrogen synthesis, such as aromatase inhibitors, lose efficacy because in a state of estrogen independence, the ER is stimulated without the need for estrogen, thus leading to constant ER activity. These mutations are rare in primary tumors; however, the frequency can be up to 30x higher in metastatic lesions.

Another mechanism by which modifications to the ESR1 gene can lead to endocrine therapy resistance is by the occurrence of translocations. During translocations, a fusion protein is formed between YAP1, a gene crucial for proliferation and apoptosis (programmed cell death) of cells, and ESR1. The creation of this fusion protein can allow the tumor to grow independent of estrogen, develop anti-estrogen resistance, have induced cell motility and constitutive expression of ER target genes.

Finally, it has been shown that there can be ESR1 gene amplification of up to 37% in breast cancer patients. However as of now there is no research showing a clear correlation between this amplification and endocrine resistance.

=== miRNA regulators ===
miRNAs are non-coding sections of RNA that are involved in gene expression. It has been shown that upregulation of some of these miRNAs may be associated with the development of anti-estrogen resistance via two potential pathways. First by activating alternative growth pathways and secondly by inhibition of ER expression. Some of examples of this are described below.

miR-155 stimulates the STAT3 signaling pathway, and this is associated with cell survival and endocrine resistance, specifically resistance to tamoxifen. In terms of inhibition, certain miRNAs are known to inhibit key inhibitors of the p27 pathway, hence allowing it carry on unchecked. Inhibition of the p27 pathway is well known for causing cell proliferation in tumors, and the levels of p27 can be measured and used as a marker for tamoxifen resistance.

In contrast to this, downregulation of other miRNAs is also associated with the development of endocrine resistance. Some miRNAs act as inhibitors to ERα-36 which acts as an ERβ antagonist and an agonist of estrogen-like SERM effects. Therefore, low levels of these mRNAs are associated with ERα-36 mediated resistance.

Another mechanism by which down-regulation of miRNAs may be implicated in the development of endocrine therapy resistance is by leading to overexpression of CDK3 and enhanced transcriptional activity of ER.

=== GPER ===
GPER is a transmembrane protein that acts as an estrogen receptor, and it is present in 50-60% of breast cancer cases. The cellular location of GPER seems to correlate somewhat with tumor prognosis, where cytoplasmic GPER is associated with lower grade tumors and nuclear GPER with higher rates of metastasis.

The signaling pathways associated with the GPER protein involve tyrosine kinases (from the Src family). Additionally, there is crosstalk between the GPER and EGFR signaling pathways.

Tamoxifen has been shown to increase expression of GPER by binding to its receptor. The signaling pathways initiated lead not only to tamoxifen resistance, but also a higher risk of metastasis and cell growth. The overall survival rate hence decreases for patients displaying high GPER expression.

=== PR expression ===
PR (progesterone receptor) is a gene expressed in around 50% of ER+ breast cancer patients. Clinical studies have shown that ER+/PR+ cases are more sensitive to endocrine therapy than ER+/PR- cases, suggesting that the loss of PR expression is associated with the development of endocrine therapy resistance. PR levels have been shown to be downregulated when there is activation of growth factors via the PI3K/Akt/mTOR pathway.

=== HER2 over-expression ===
Over-expression of HER2 is found to be present in around 30% of metastatic breast tumors and is associated with a poorer prognosis. Studies have demonstrated that there is crosstalk between HER2 and ER signaling pathways. Specifically, studies have shown there is crosstalk between HER2 and the ER coactivator A1B1 which could enhance the estrogen agonist activity of tamoxifen bound ER. Additionally, HER2 has physical associations with the cell membrane ER and interactions between them have been shown to block ER-initiated apoptosis.

== Tackling endocrine resistance ==
When tackling endocrine resistance in breast cancer, the current strategies are focused around combining hormonal agents with drugs targeting several escape pathways, as outlined in the mechanisms of endocrine resistance section. The aim is to block all the tumor survival escapes.

The main approach in overcoming endocrine resistance in those breast cancers that are both ER+ and HER2+ is by using a combination of endocrine and HER2-targeting agents.

In trials conducted with a combination of anti-HER2 agents and an aromatase inhibitor, significant clinical benefit and improved progression-free survival have been observed.

Trastuzumab is an example of an anti-HER2 agent which mainly depresses the growth of cells which are over-expressing HER2.

Many endocrine resistant breast cancers which don’t respond to aromatase inhibitors still depend on ER signaling.

Selective Estrogen Receptor Degraders (SERDs) can be used in these cases as they destabilize the ER and act as pure antagonists at the ER receptor. An example SERD is fulvestrant which binds to the ER to block its dimerization and nuclear localization. The fulvestrant-ER complex is unstable, resulting in degradation.

There has also been research into the combined inhibition of the ER and EGFR. An example of a pure EGFR inhibitor is gefitinib, which has been used in phase II trials to evaluate its addition to tamoxifen in patients with HR-positive advanced breast cancer.

The PI3K-Akt-mTOR signaling pathway and crosstalk with the ER signaling pathway is thought to be involved in the development of resistance to endocrine therapy. Therefore, studies have been done to assess the efficacy of using mTOR inhibitors, such as everolimus or temsirolimus, in ER-positive breast cancers.

Some preclinical and clinical studies have shown the possibility of mTOR inhibitors as a first step treatment to shrink the breast cancer tumor before the main treatment of an aromatase inhibitor is given. It is agreed that more clinical trials are needed to confirm this issue.

Additionally, cyclin-dependent kinase (CDK) 4/6 inhibition has shown to improve the efficacy of endocrine treatment.
