= DES Action USA =

Consumer health advocacy organization

DES Action USA is a national consumer advocacy group, whose mission is to educate and raise awareness about diethylstilbestrol (DES) in the public and medical and legal professions, support the DES-exposed population, and advocate for consumer vigilance and rights.

== History of DES ==
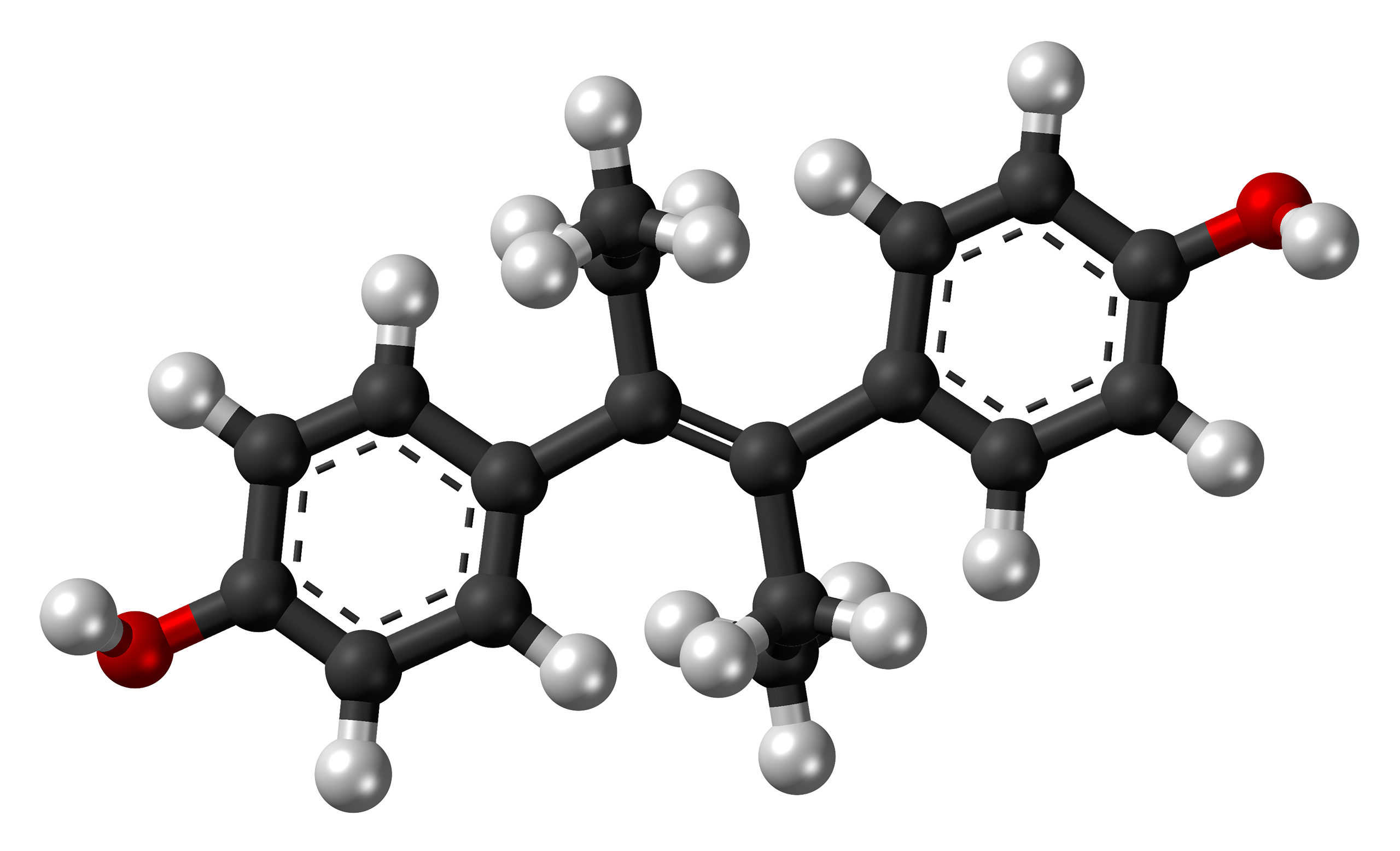
Diethylstilbestrol molecule ball

DES is a synthetic estrogen, which was, from about 1940, prescribed to women at risk of miscarriage and, later, to promote healthy babies. Medical research has now shown that DES has adverse effects and that the approximately 10 million DES-exposed people are at risk for cancer, infertility, pregnancy complications, and other health problems.

The drug came onto the United States market in 1940 from several manufacturers, since the drug was both unpatented and cheap to produce. Despite research demonstrating possible carcinogenic effects (documented in the 1930s) and its inefficacy for preventing miscarriage in 1953, pharmaceutical companies publicized earlier and more favorable studies in their marketing and promotion. In 1971, medical researchers identified several clusters of rare vaginal cancers in some of the children exposed to DES in utero, now teenagers and young adults. The news was alarming to many of the women who had taken the drug during their pregnancies.

== Early DES advocacy ==
As the women's health movement was developing during the same years, concerned women around the country used the model of local organizing and outreach to find other DES-exposed women and their children (known as DES mothers, sons, and daughters).

One of the earliest gatherings was of the DES Information Group, founded by Pat Cody (1923-2010) in 1974, working with the Berkeley Free Clinic in California. Cody's group soon joined with the DES Action Committee of the San Francisco-based Committee for the Medical Rights of Women, and the two groups merged into a Bay-area organization. Similar grassroots organizations were being started in Connecticut, Illinois, Massachusetts, New Jersey, New York, and Pennsylvania.

In February 1978, U.S. Secretary of the Department of Health, Education, and Welfare (HEW), Joseph Califano, convened the National DES Task Force. It was charged with making recommendations for research and continuing treatment for persons exposed to DES. The task force issued a physician advisory in November 1978 recommending doctors review their records and notify patients who were prescribed DES.

== Founding ==
DES Action National (later renamed DES Action USA) formed in 1977 with a meeting of these grassroots groups. The organization incorporated as a non-profit in 1979.

Much of DES Action USA's early work was at local and state levels. Public health grants and legislative efforts supported educational outreach and medical care in California and New York. DES Action USA also successfully lobbied that a Federal Task Force be established. During the 1980s, work at state and national levels resulted in several official National DES Awareness Weeks (1983-1985), continued educational work and outreach efforts, and support for liability litigation cases against manufacturers.

== Advocacy and legislation ==
Aware of the need for national funding for DES research and education, director Nora Cody (daughter of Pat Cody) worked closely with Representative Louise M. Slaughter (D-NY) to draft and support a research bill during the early 1990s. The bill was signed into law in 1992, with a second bill passed in 1998 to support research on the third generation of DES-affected people (the grandchildren of DES mothers). Through the early 2000s, their most high-profile work involved working with the Centers for Disease Control to develop and distribute consumer and health professional medical education materials to communicate the latest research about continuing effects of DES exposure.

In 2014, DES Action USA, facing the aging of its leadership, chose to merge with another medical nonprofit, the MedShadow Foundation, which does similar educational and outreach work but focuses on the risks and long-term adverse effects of many prescription drugs. The decision allowed the DES Action USA Board to step down from administration, while allowing DES Action USA to continue its work and mission.
