= Dimestrol =

Chemical compound

Clinical data
- Trade names: Depot-Ostromon; Depot-Oestromon; Depot-Cyren; Synthila
- Other names: Dianisylhexene; 4,4'-Dimethoxy-α,α'-diethylstilbene; Diethylstilbestrol dimethyl ether; Dimethoxydiethylstilbestrol; (E)-4,4'-(1,2-Diethylethylene)dianisole
- Drug class: Nonsteroidal estrogen; Estrogen ether

Identifiers
- IUPAC name: 1-methoxy-4-[(E)-4-(4-methoxyphenyl)hex-3-en-3-yl]benzene
- CAS Number: 130-79-0
- PubChem CID: 3032539
- ChemSpider: 2297488
- UNII: 6H0MA01FTS
- KEGG: C14391
- ChEMBL: ChEMBL113650
- CompTox Dashboard (EPA): DTXSID60860026 DTXSID4022494, DTXSID60860026
- ECHA InfoCard: 100.004.542

Chemical and physical data
- Formula: C_{20}H_{24}O_{2}
- Molar mass: 296.410 g·mol^{−1}
- 3D model (JSmol): Interactive image
- SMILES: CCC(=C(CC)C1=CC=C(C=C1)OC)C2=CC=C(C=C2)OC
- InChI: InChI=1S/C20H24O2/c1-5-19(15-7-11-17(21-3)12-8-15)20(6-2)16-9-13-18(22-4)14-10-16/h7-14H,5-6H2,1-4H3/b20-19+; Key:VQOAQMIKPYNCMV-FMQUCBEESA-N

Dimestrol (brand names Depot-Cyren, Depot-Oestromon), also known as dianisylhexene, 4,4'-dimethoxy-α,α'-diethylstilbene, diethylstilbestrol dimethyl ether, and dimethoxydiethylstilbestrol, is a synthetic nonsteroidal estrogen of the stilbestrol group which is related to diethylstilbestrol. It has been used clinically as a hormonal therapy in cases of delayed female puberty, hypogonadism, menopausal, and postmenopausal symptoms. It is known to induce the development of female secondary sexual characteristics in the case of female delayed puberty or hypogonadism. The drug has also been used as a growth promoter in livestock.

DES is a known endocrine disrupting chemical. Molecularly, it is known to increase the risk of aneuploidy via interference with microtubule assembly.

Prior to the 1950s, DES was widely prescribed to pregnant women to prevent miscarriage and preterm labor. A study released in the 1950s found that women who were exposed to DES were at increased risk for cervical and vaginal clear cell adenocarcinoma. Shortly after this finding, the FDA discouraged the prescription of DES to pregnant women. Children were also affected by the maternal use of DES during their gestation. Study findings showed that daughters were more likely to develop fertility complications such as premature delivery, neonatal death, miscarriage, ectopic pregnancy, stillbirth, infertility, and preeclampsia. DES exposed sons may also experience genital abnormalities but no conclusive increased risk of infertility.

In the case of suspected or known exposure to DES before, women are encouraged to receive pelvic examinations, PAP tests, biopsies, and breast examinations. Men should receive routine examinations from their physician in the case of suspected or potential exposure.

The medication has a long duration of action of 6 weeks given by intramuscular injection.

Parenteral potencies and durations of nonsteroidal estrogens
Estrogen	Form	Major brand name(s)	EPD (14 days)	Duration
Diethylstilbestrol (DES)	Oil solution	Metestrol	20 mg	1 mg ≈ 2–3 days; 3 mg ≈ 3 days
Diethylstilbestrol dipropionate	Oil solution	Cyren B	12.5–15 mg	2.5 mg ≈ 5 days
Diethylstilbestrol dipropionate	Aqueous suspension	?	5 mg	? mg = 21–28 days
Dimestrol (DES dimethyl ether)	Oil solution	Depot-Cyren, Depot-Oestromon, Retalon Retard	20–40 mg	?
Fosfestrol (DES diphosphate)^{a}	Aqueous solution	Honvan	?	<1 day
Dienestrol diacetate	Aqueous suspension	Farmacyrol-Kristallsuspension	50 mg	?
Hexestrol dipropionate	Oil solution	Hormoestrol, Retalon Oleosum	25 mg	?
Hexestrol diphosphate^{a}	Aqueous solution	Cytostesin, Pharmestrin, Retalon Aquosum	?	Very short
Note: All by intramuscular injection unless otherwise noted. Footnotes: ^{a} = By intravenous injection. Sources: See template.

== Synthesis ==
Ex 7: The action of titanium(III) chloride and lithium aluminium hydride on 4'-methoxypropiophenone [121-97-1] causes a McMurry reaction in 85% yield.

Ex 8: The action of titanium(IV) chloride and zinc dust on 4'-methoxypropiophenone causes a McMurry reaction in 91% yield.

Ref:

== See also ==
- List of estrogen esters § Ethers of nonsteroidal estrogens
