= Hormone therapy =

Use of hormones in medical treatment

Hormone therapy or hormonal therapy is the use of hormones in medical treatment. Treatment with hormone antagonists may also be referred to as hormonal therapy or antihormone therapy. The most general classes of hormone therapy are oncologic hormone therapy, hormone replacement therapy (menopausal), androgen replacement therapy, oral contraceptive pills, and gender-affirming hormone therapy.

== Types ==
- Hormone replacement therapy (HRT), also known as menopausal hormone therapy (MHT), is for women with menopausal symptoms. It is based on the idea that the treatment may prevent discomfort caused by diminished circulating estrogen and progesterone hormones, or in the case of the surgically or prematurely menopausal, that it may prolong life and may reduce incidence of dementia. It involves the use of one or more of a group of medications designed to artificially boost hormone levels. The main types of hormones involved are estrogen, progesterone, or progestins, and sometimes, testosterone. It is often referred to as "treatment" rather than therapy.
- Hormone replacement therapy for people with hypogonadism and intersex conditions (e.g., Klinefelter syndrome, Turner syndrome)
- Androgen replacement therapy (ART) in males with low levels of testosterone due to disease or aging. It is a hormone treatment often prescribed to counter the effects of male hypogonadism or for men who have lost their testicular function to disease, cancer, or other causes. It is sometimes used for late-onset hypogonadism (so-called "andropause"), but the significance of a decrease in testosterone levels is debated and its treatment with replacement is controversial. The Food and Drug Administration (FDA) stated in 2015 that neither the benefits nor the safety of testosterone have been established in older men with low testosterone levels.
- Gender-affirming hormone therapy for transgender people introduces sex steroids associated with the gender that the patient identifies with (notably testosterone for transgender men and estrogen for transgender women). Some intersex and non-binary people may also undergo hormone therapy. Cross-sex hormone treatment for transgender individuals is divided into two main types: feminizing and masculinizing.
  - Feminizing hormone therapy for transgender women
  - Masculinizing hormone therapy for transgender men
- Hormonal therapy for cancer
  - Androgen deprivation therapy for men with prostate cancer
  - Estrogen deprivation therapy for women with estrogen receptor-positive breast cancer
  - High-dose estrogen therapy for women with estrogen receptor-positive breast cancer
- Chemical castration of men or sex offenders with paraphilias or hypersexuality
- Growth hormone therapy for growth hormone deficiency
- Thyroid hormone replacement in hypothyroidism
- Antithyroid therapy in hyperthyroidism
- Glucocorticoid and/or mineralocorticoid replacement in conditions such as Addison's disease
- Antiglucocorticoid therapy in Cushing's syndrome
- Insulin therapy in type 1 diabetes
- Oral contraceptive pills for various purposes including birth control
- Menstrual suppression
- Bioidentical Hormone Replacement Therapy is a bioidentical hormone replacement therapy uses hormones that are chemically identical to those the human body produces. One effective form of BHRT is hormone pellet therapy, which involves implanting tiny pellets under the skin that release hormones over time to balance hormonal levels, potentially alleviating symptoms such as chronic fatigue, irritability, and sexual dysfunction.

== See also ==
- Life extension
- Hormone replacement therapy
- Feminizing hormone therapy
