= Paroxypropione =

Chemical compound

Clinical data
- Trade names: Frenantol, Frenormon, Hypophenon, Paroxon, Possipione, Profenone, others
- Other names: Paraoxypropiophenone; H-365; NSC-2834; 4'-Hydroxypropiophenone; Ethyl p-hydroxyphenyl ketone; p-Propionylphenol; Paroxypropiophenone; Parahydroxypropiophenone; PHP
- Drug class: Nonsteroidal estrogen; Antigonadotropin
- ATC code: None

Legal status
- Legal status: In general: ℞ (Prescription only)

Identifiers
- IUPAC name: 1-(4-hydroxyphenyl)-1-propanone
- CAS Number: 70-70-2
- PubChem CID: 6271
- ChemSpider: 6035
- UNII: X9952001TG
- CompTox Dashboard (EPA): DTXSID8023426
- ECHA InfoCard: 100.000.676

Chemical and physical data
- Formula: C_{9}H_{10}O_{2}
- Molar mass: 150.177 g·mol^{−1}
- 3D model (JSmol): Interactive image
- SMILES: CCC(=O)c1ccc(cc1)O
- InChI: InChI=1S/C9H10O2/c1-2-9(11)7-3-5-8(10)6-4-7/h3-6,10H,2H2,1H3; Key:RARSHUDCJQSEFJ-UHFFFAOYSA-N

Paroxypropione, also known as paraoxypropiophenone, is a synthetic nonsteroidal estrogen which has been used medically as an antigonadotropin in Spain and Italy but appears to no longer be marketed. It was first synthesized in 1902. The antigonadotropic properties of the drug were discovered in 1951 and it entered clinical use shortly thereafter.

== Pharmacology ==
=== Pharmacodynamics ===
Paroxypropione is closely related structurally to p-hydroxybenzoic acid and parabens such as methylparaben, and also bears a close resemblance to diethylstilbestrol (which, in fact, produces paroxypropione as an active metabolite) and alkylphenols like nonylphenol, all of which are also estrogens. The drug possesses relatively low affinity for the estrogen receptor and must be given at high dosages to achieve significant estrogenic and antigonadotropic effects, for instance, 0.8 to 1.6 g/day. It possesses 0.1% of the estrogenic activity and less than 0.5% of the antigonadotropic potency of estrone.

== Chemistry ==
=== Synthesis ===
The highest reported yield, approximately 96%, is from the between phenol and propionyl chloride. The mechanism is likely to involve initial esterification to give phenyl propionate, which then undergoes a Fries rearrangement.

=== Derivatives ===
Paroxypropione is a precursor in the chemical synthesis of diethylstilbestrol and dienestrol.

== Society and culture ==
=== Names ===
Brand names Frenantol, Frenormon, Hypophenon, Paroxon, Possipione, Profenone, numerous others; former developmental code name NSC-2834, also known as paroxypropiophenone (P.O.P.) or 4'-hydroxypropiophenone.

== Research ==
Paroxypropione was studied and used in the treatment of breast cancer. This activity is presumably related to the microtubule-targeting agent (MTA) activity of paroxypropione, which binds to tubulin and favours its polymerization into microtubules.
