= Hormone antagonist =

Chemical inhibiting the function of glands

Structure of abiraterone acetate, a hormone antagonist treatment for prostate cancer.

For the use of hormone antagonists in cancer, see hormonal therapy (oncology)

A hormone antagonist is a molecule, produced either synthetically or endogenously, that binds to a specific hormone receptor to block the effect or synthesis of that hormone. There are many types of hormone antagonists, such as gonadotropin-releasing hormone (GnRH) antagonists, estrogen antagonists, and androgen antagonists.

Organisms may use hormone antagonists to modify the action of their hormone receptors. For example, ghrelin is a hormone that stimulates appetite and growth hormone release by activating the growth hormone secretagogue receptor (GHSR). LEAP2 was found to be a peptide hormone synthesized by the liver and small intestine that blocks the GHSR activation by ghrelin, thereby reducing appetite.

Synthetically produced hormone antagonists can also be used as anticancer treatments for hormone-sensitive cancers like breast cancer and prostate cancer.

== Anti-cancer treatments ==
=== Breast cancer ===
Hormone antagonists are used widely in anticancer treatments, such as the drug tamoxifen, an anti-estrogen that binds to estrogen receptors to slow the growth of some estrogen receptor-positive breast cancers. Aromatase inhibitors (AIs) are also prescribed as a breast cancer treatment, especially after mastectomies. AIs work by blocking the action of the aromatase enzyme, which converts androgens, like testosterone, into estrogen. Aromatase inhibitors can be used in conjunction with estrogen receptor inhibitors to treat estrogen receptor-positive breast cancers in women who have gone through menopause already.

=== Prostate cancer ===
Anti-androgens such as enzalutamide can be used as a treatment for prostate cancer, which, by binding to the androgen receptor, can inhibit the binding of testosterone. Androgens may promote prostate cancer, with the main androgens secreted by the testicles being testosterone and dihydroxytestosterone (DHT). Some androgens can be made by the adrenal glands, which are located above the kidneys. Abiraterone Acetate may also act as a hormone antagonist of androgens through its action as a CYP17 inhibitor. Abarelix, a GnRH antagonist may also be used for the treatment of prostate cancer.
