= Quadrosilan =

Chemical compound

Clinical data
- Trade names: Cisobitan
- Other names: Quadrosilane; KABI-1774; 2,6-cisdiphenylhexa- methylcyclotetrasiloxane
- Drug class: Nonsteroidal estrogen

Identifiers
- IUPAC name: 2,2,4,6,6,8-hexamethyl-4,8-diphenyl-1,3,5,7,2,4,6,8-tetraoxatetrasilocane
- CAS Number: 4657-20-9
- PubChem CID: 20774
- ChemSpider: 19557
- UNII: MM48TFA73C
- CompTox Dashboard (EPA): DTXSID3063546

Chemical and physical data
- Formula: C_{18}H_{28}O_{4}Si_{4}
- Molar mass: 420.758 g·mol^{−1}
- 3D model (JSmol): Interactive image
- SMILES: C[Si]1(O[Si](O[Si](O[Si](O1)(C)C2=CC=CC=C2)(C)C)(C)C3=CC=CC=C3)C
- InChI: InChI=1S/C18H28O4Si4/c1-23(2)19-25(5,17-13-9-7-10-14-17)21-24(3,4)22-26(6,20-23)18-15-11-8-12-16-18/h7-16H,1-6H3; Key:ZTQZMPQJXABFNC-UHFFFAOYSA-N

Quadrosilan (INN, BAN) (brand name Cisobitan; former developmental code name KABI-1774) is a synthetic nonsteroidal estrogen that was developed in the 1970s and that is or has been used as an antigonadotropic agent in the treatment of prostate cancer. It is an organosilicon compound, and is also known as 2,6-cisdiphenylhexamethylcyclotetrasiloxane. Quadrosilan has estrogenic activity equivalent to that of estradiol, and can produce feminization and gynecomastia as side effects in male patients.

== See also ==
- Paroxypropione
- Metallibure
