= Hexestrol diphosphate =

Chemical compound

Clinical data
- Trade names: Cytostatin, Cytostesin, Pharmestrin, Retalon Aquosum
- Other names: DA-268; NSC-35752
- Routes of administration: Intravenous injection
- Drug class: Estrogen; Nonsteroidal estrogen

Identifiers
- IUPAC name: [4-[(3S,4R)-4-(4-phosphonooxyphenyl)hexan-3-yl]phenyl] dihydrogen phosphate
- CAS Number: 24809-02-7
- PubChem CID: 193055
- ChemSpider: 167536
- UNII: 30L14W008X
- ChEMBL: ChEMBL1162236
- CompTox Dashboard (EPA): DTXSID901016489

Chemical and physical data
- Formula: C_{18}H_{24}O_{8}P_{2}
- Molar mass: 430.330 g·mol^{−1}
- 3D model (JSmol): Interactive image
- SMILES: CCC(C1=CC=C(C=C1)OP(=O)(O)O)C(CC)C2=CC=C(C=C2)OP(=O)(O)O
- InChI: InChI=1S/C18H24O8P2/c1-3-17(13-5-9-15(10-6-13)25-27(19,20)21)18(4-2)14-7-11-16(12-8-14)26-28(22,23)24/h5-12,17-18H,3-4H2,1-2H3,(H2,19,20,21)(H2,22,23,24)/t17-,18+; Key:JBDIWCWZUDNWTL-HDICACEKSA-N

Hexestrol diphosphate (brand names Cytostatin, Cytostesin, Pharmestrin, Retalon Aquosum) is a synthetic, nonsteroidal estrogen of the stilbestrol group related to diethylstilbestrol and used as an estrogen and antineoplastic agent in the treatment of prostate cancer. It is a water-soluble ester of hexestrol. The medication has been known since at least 1956.

== See also ==
- Hexestrol diacetate
- Hexestrol dicaprylate
- Hexestrol dipropionate
