= Fosfestrol =

Chemical compound

Clinical data
- Trade names: Honvan, others
- Other names: Diethylstilbestrol diphosphate; Stilbestrol diphosphate; DESDP; DESP; DES-DP; DES-P
- AHFS/Drugs.com: International Drug Names
- Routes of administration: Intravenous, by mouth
- Drug class: Nonsteroidal estrogen; Estrogen ester
- ATC code: L02AA04 (WHO)

Legal status
- Legal status: In general: ℞ (Prescription only)

Identifiers
- IUPAC name: [4-[4-(4-phosphonooxyphenyl)hex-3-en-3-yl]phenoxy]phosphonic acid
- CAS Number: 522-40-7 4719-75-9 (tetrasodium)
- PubChem CID: 3032325
- ChemSpider: 2297327
- UNII: A0E0NMA80F
- KEGG: D00946
- ChEMBL: ChEMBL1200598
- CompTox Dashboard (EPA): DTXSID3046906
- ECHA InfoCard: 100.007.573

Chemical and physical data
- Formula: C_{18}H_{22}O_{8}P_{2}
- Molar mass: 428.314 g·mol^{−1}
- 3D model (JSmol): Interactive image
- SMILES: O=P(Oc1ccc(cc1)\C(=C(\c2ccc(OP(=O)(O)O)cc2)CC)CC)(O)O
- InChI: InChI=1S/C18H22O8P2/c1-3-17(13-5-9-15(10-6-13)25-27(19,20)21)18(4-2)14-7-11-16(12-8-14)26-28(22,23)24/h5-12H,3-4H2,1-2H3,(H2,19,20,21)(H2,22,23,24)/b18-17+; Key:NLORYLAYLIXTID-ISLYRVAYSA-N

Fosfestrol, sold under the brand name Honvan and also known as diethylstilbestrol diphosphate (DESDP), is an estrogen medication which is used in the treatment of prostate cancer in men. It is given by slow intravenous infusion once per day to once per week or by mouth once per day.

Side effects of fosfestrol include nausea and vomiting, cardiovascular complications, blood clots, edema, and genital skin reactions, among others. Fosfestrol is an estrogen, and hence is an agonist of the estrogen receptor, the biological target of estrogens like estradiol. It acts as a prodrug of diethylstilbestrol.

Fosfestrol was patented in 1941 and was introduced for medical use in 1955. It was previously marketed widely throughout the world, but now remains available in only a few countries.

== Medical uses ==
Fosfestrol is used as a form of high-dose estrogen therapy in the treatment of castration-resistant prostate cancer. It is added once progression of metastases has occurred following therapy with other interventions such orchiectomy, gonadotropin-releasing hormone modulators, and nonsteroidal antiandrogens. Fosfestrol has also been used to prevent the testosterone flare at the start of gonadotropin-releasing hormone agonist therapy in men with prostate cancer.

Fosfestrol sodium is given at a dosage of 600 to 1200 mg/day by slow intravenous infusion over a period of 1 hour for a treatment duration of 5 to 10 days in men with prostate cancer. Following this, it is given at a dose of 300 mg/day for 10 to 20 days. Maintenance doses of fosfestrol sodium of 300 to 600 mg may be given four times per week. This may be gradually reduced to one 300 to 600-mg dose per week over a period of several months.

Fosfestrol sodium is also used to a lesser extent by oral administration initially at a dosage of 360 to 480 mg three times per day in the treatment of prostate cancer. Maintenance doses of 120 to 240 mg three times per day may be used and can be gradually reduced to 240 mg/day.

Estrogen dosages for prostate cancer
Route/form	Estrogen	Dosage
Oral	Estradiol	1–2 mg 3x/day
Oral	Conjugated estrogens	1.25–2.5 mg 3x/day
Oral	Ethinylestradiol	0.15–3 mg/day
Oral	Ethinylestradiol sulfonate	1–2 mg 1x/week
Oral	Diethylstilbestrol	1–3 mg/day
Oral	Dienestrol	5 mg/day
Oral	Hexestrol	5 mg/day
Oral	Fosfestrol	100–480 mg 1–3x/day
Oral	Chlorotrianisene	12–48 mg/day
Oral	Quadrosilan	900 mg/day
Oral	Estramustine phosphate	140–1400 mg/day
Transdermal patch	Estradiol	2–6x 100 μg/day Scrotal: 1x 100 μg/day
IM or SC injection	Estradiol benzoate	1.66 mg 3x/week
IM or SC injection	Estradiol dipropionate	5 mg 1x/week
IM or SC injection	Estradiol valerate	10–40 mg 1x/1–2 weeks
IM or SC injection	Estradiol undecylate	100 mg 1x/4 weeks
IM or SC injection	Polyestradiol phosphate	Alone: 160–320 mg 1x/4 weeks With oral EE: 40–80 mg 1x/4 weeks
IM or SC injection	Estrone	2–4 mg 2–3x/week
IV injection	Fosfestrol	300–1200 mg 1–7x/week
IV injection	Estramustine phosphate	240–450 mg/day
Note: Dosages are not necessarily equivalent. Sources: See template.

=== Available forms ===
Fosfestrol is available in the form of solutions for intravenous administration and tablets for oral administration.

== Side effects ==
Side effects of fosfestrol include nausea and vomiting in 80% of patients (with 1 in 25 cases, or 4%, resulting in death), cardiovascular complications (18% with fosfestrol plus adriamycin relative to 2% with adriamycin alone) such as thrombosis (2 in 25 cases, or 8%), edema (44% requiring diuretic therapy), and skin reactions such as burning, itching, or pain in the genital area (40%). In addition, weight gain, feminization, and gynecomastia may occur.

== Pharmacology ==
=== Pharmacodynamics ===
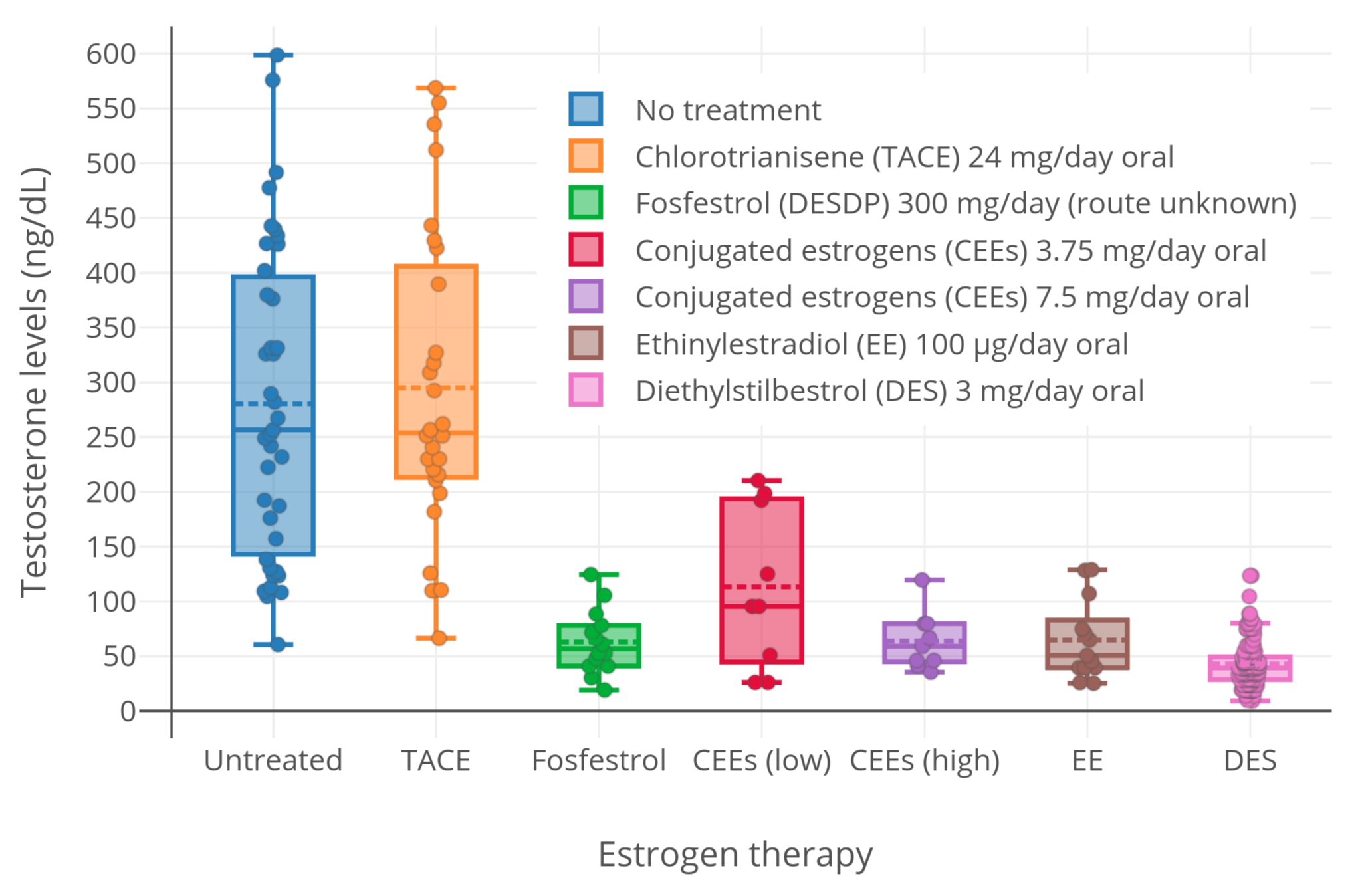
Testosterone levels with no treatment and with various estrogens in men with prostate cancer. Determinations were made with an early radioimmunoassay (RIA). Source was Shearer et al. (1973).

Fosfestrol is an estrogen, or an agonist of the estrogen receptors. It is inactive itself and acts as a prodrug of diethylstilbestrol. Similarly to diethylstilbestrol, fosfestrol has powerful antigonadotropic effects and strongly suppresses testosterone levels in men. It decreases testosterone levels into the castrate range within 12 hours of the initiation of therapy. Fosfestrol may also act by other mechanisms, such as via direct cytotoxic effects in the prostate gland.

=== Pharmacokinetics ===
The pharmacokinetics of fosfestrol have been studied.

== Chemistry ==
Fosfestrol is a synthetic nonsteroidal estrogen of the stilbestrol group. It is an estrogen ester; specifically, it is the diphosphate ester of diethylstilbestrol.

Fosfestrol is provided both as the free base and as a tetrasodium salt. In terms of dose equivalence, 300 mg anhydrous fosfestrol sodium is equal to about 250 mg fosfestrol.

A polymer of fosfestrol, polydiethylstilbestrol phosphate, was developed as a long-acting estrogen for potential use in veterinary medicine, but was never marketed.

== History ==
Fosfestrol was first patented in 1941 and was mentioned in the literature by Huggins. Conjugated estrogens and diethylstilbestrol sulfate, which are water-soluble estrogens, were first reported to be effective in the treatment of prostate cancer via intravenous administration in 1952. Starting in October 1952, Flocks and colleagues studied intravenous fosfestrol in the treatment of prostate cancer, publishing their findings in 1955. Fosfestrol was first introduced for medical use in 1955 under the brand names Stilphostrol and ST 52 in the United States and France, respectively.

== Society and culture ==
=== Generic names ===
Fosfestrol is the generic name of the drug and its INN, BAN, and JAN, while diethylstilbestrol diphosphate is its USAN and fosfestrolo is its DCIT. It is also known as stilbestrol diphosphate. Fosfestrol sodium is its INNM and BANM.

=== Brand names ===
Brand names of fosfestrol include Cytonal, Difostilben, Honovan, Honvan, Honvol, Honvon, Fosfostilben, Fostrolin, ST 52, Stilbetin, Stilbol, Stilbostatin, Stilphostrol, and Vagestrol, among others.

=== Availability ===
Fosfestrol has been marketed widely throughout the world, including in the United States, Canada, Europe, Asia, Latin America, and South Africa, among other areas of the world. However, today, it appears to remain available only in a few countries, including Bangladesh, Egypt, India, Oman, and Tunisia.

== See also ==
- Estramustine phosphate
