= Dienestrol =

Chemical compound

Clinical data
- Trade names: Ortho Dienestrol, Dienoestrol, Dienoestrol Ortho, Sexadien, Cycladiene, Denestrolin, Dienol, Dinovex, Follormon, Oestrodiene, Synestrol
- Other names: Dienoestrol; p-[(E,E)-1-Ethylidene-2-(p-hydroxyphenyl)-2-butenyl]phenol; 3,4-Di(para-hydroxyphenyl)-2,4-hexadiene
- AHFS/Drugs.com: Micromedex Detailed Consumer Information
- Drug class: Nonsteroidal estrogen
- ATC code: G03CB01 (WHO) G03CC02 (WHO)

Identifiers
- IUPAC name: 4-[4-(4-hydroxyphenyl)hexa-2,4-dien-3-yl]phenol
- CAS Number: 13029-44-2
- PubChem CID: 667476
- IUPHAR/BPS: 7160
- DrugBank: DB00890
- ChemSpider: 580857
- UNII: RRW32X4U1F
- KEGG: D00898
- ChEBI: CHEBI:4518
- ChEMBL: ChEMBL1018
- CompTox Dashboard (EPA): DTXSID7022382
- ECHA InfoCard: 100.001.381

Chemical and physical data
- Formula: C_{18}H_{18}O_{2}
- Molar mass: 266.340 g·mol^{−1}
- 3D model (JSmol): Interactive image
- SMILES: Oc2ccc(C(/C(c1ccc(O)cc1)=C/C)=C\C)cc2
- InChI: InChI=1S/C18H18O2/c1-3-17(13-5-9-15(19)10-6-13)18(4-2)14-7-11-16(20)12-8-14/h3-12,19-20H,1-2H3/b17-3+,18-4+; Key:NFDFQCUYFHCNBW-SCGPFSFSSA-N

Dienestrol (INN, USAN) (brand names Dienoestrol, Denestrolin, Dienol and many others (Note: Other trade names of the medication include Ortho Dienestrol, Dienoestrol Ortho, Sexadien, Dinovex, Follormon, Oestrodiene, and Synestrol)), also known as dienoestrol (BAN), is a synthetic nonsteroidal estrogen medication of the stilbestrol group which is or was used to treat menopausal symptoms in the United States and Europe. It has been studied for use by rectal administration in the treatment of prostate cancer in men as well. The medication was introduced in the U.S. in 1947 by Schering as Synestrol and in France in 1948 as Cycladiene. Dienestrol is a close analogue of diethylstilbestrol. It has approximately 223% and 404% of the affinity of estradiol at the ERα and ERβ, respectively.

Dienestrol diacetate (brand names Faragynol, Gynocyrol, others) also exists and has been used medically.

== Isomers ==
Dienestrol (unspecified) - CAS 84-17-3

E,E-Dienestrol - CAS 13029-44-2

Z,Z-Dienestrol - CAS 35495-11-5

== See also ==
- Benzestrol
- Hexestrol
- Methestrol
