= List of investigational sex-hormonal agents =

This is a list of investigational sex-hormonal agents, or sex-hormonal agents that are currently under development for clinical use but are not yet approved. Chemical/generic names are listed first, with developmental code names, synonyms, and brand names in parentheses.

This list was last comprehensively updated sometime between May 2017 and September 2021. It is likely to become outdated with time.

== Androgenics ==
=== Androgen receptor agonists ===
- Deuterated testosterone (AVA-291; AVA291; d3-testosterone; d3-T; testosterone-19-d3) – deuterated and highly aromatase-resistant testosterone analogue with little/no estrogenic activity
- EC586 – oral prodrug of testosterone (androgen/anabolic steroid) with improved pharmacokinetics

=== Selective androgen receptor modulators ===
- DT-200 (G-100192, GLPG-0492) – selective androgen receptor modulator for Duchenne muscular dystrophy
- Enobosarm (ostarine; GTx-024, MK-2866; S-22; VERU-024) – selective androgen receptor modulator for breast cancer
- GSK-2881078 – selective androgen receptor modulator for cachexia
- OPK-88004 (LY-2452473; OPK-88004; TT-701) – selective androgen receptor modulator for benign prostatic hyperplasia, erectile dysfunction, and prostate cancer
- VK-5211 (LGD-4033; ligandrol) – selective androgen receptor modulator for hip fracture and muscle atrophy
- Vosilasarm (EP-0062, RAD-140; testolone) – selective androgen receptor modulator for breast cancer

=== Androgen receptor antagonists ===
- Bavdegalutamide (AVR-110) – androgen receptor antagonist for prostate cancer
- Clascoterone (CB-03-01, Breezula, Winlevi) – androgen receptor antagonist for topical treatment of scalp hair loss
- Deutenzalutamide (deuterated enzalutamide; HC-1119) – androgen receptor antagonist for prostate cancer
- Pruxelutamide (GT-0918; proxalutamide) – androgen receptor antagonist for prostate cancer
- Pyrilutamide (KX-826) – androgen receptor antagonist for topical treatment of androgen-dependent scalp hair loss and acne
- Spironolactone (Aldactone) – androgen receptor antagonist for systemic treatment of acne

==== Atypical androgen receptor antagonists ====
- Dimethylcurcumin (ASC-J9) – androgen receptor degradation enhancer for topical acne treatment
- Masofaniten (EPI-7386) – N-terminal domain androgen receptor antagonist for prostate cancer
- Rosolutamide (ASC-JM17, JM17, ALZ-003) – androgen receptor degradation enhancer

=== Androgen synthesis inhibitors ===
- Seviteronel (VT-464) – CYP17A1 inhibitor (androgen synthesis inhibitor) for prostate cancer and breast cancer

== Estrogenics ==
=== Estrogen receptor agonists ===
- EC508 – oral prodrug of estradiol (estrogen) with improved pharmacokinetics
- Erteberel (LY-500307, SERBA-1) – selective ERβ agonist for schizophrenia
- Estetrol (Donesta) – estrogen for menopausal symptoms and other indications

=== Selective estrogen receptor modulators ===
- Acolbifene (EM-652, SCH-57068) – selective estrogen receptor modulator for breast cancer
- Afimoxifene (4-hydroxytamoxifen; 4-OHT; TamoGel) – selective estrogen receptor modulator for topical treatment of breast cancer and hyperplasia
- Amcenestrant (SAR-439859; SERD '859) – selective estrogen receptor modulator and selective estrogen receptor degrader for breast cancer
- Camizestrant (AZ14066724, AZD-9833) – selective estrogen receptor modulator and selective estrogen receptor degrader for breast cancer
- Endoxifen (4-hydroxy-N-desmethyltamoxifen) – selective estrogen receptor modulator for breast cancer
- Giredestrant (GDC-9545; RG-6171) – selective estrogen receptor modulator and selective estrogen receptor degrader for breast cancer
- Imlunestrant (LY-3484356) – selective estrogen receptor modulator and selective estrogen receptor degrader for breast cancer and endometrial cancer
- Rintodestrant (G1T-48) – selective estrogen receptor modulator and selective estrogen receptor degrader for breast cancer

=== Estrogen receptor antagonists ===
- Fulvestrant-3 boronic acid (ZB716) – estrogen receptor antagonist (antiestrogen) for breast cancer

=== Estrogen synthesis inhibitors ===
- Leflutrozole (BGS-649) – aromatase inhibitor (estrogen synthesis inhibitor) for male hypogonadism

== Progestogenics ==
=== Progesterone receptor agonists ===
- Hydroxyprogesterone caproate (LPCN-1107) – oral progesterone receptor agonist (progestogen/progestin) for prevention of preterm labor
- VOLT-02 – water-soluble conjugate of progesterone and neurosteroid for traumatic brain injury and gynecological disorders

=== Selective progesterone receptor modulators ===
- Telapristone (CDB-4124, Proellex, Proellex-V, Progenta) – selective progesterone receptor modulator for breast cancer, endometriosis, and uterine fibroids
- Vilaprisan (BAY-1002670) – selective progesterone receptor modulator for endometriosis and uterine fibroids

=== Progesterone receptor antagonists ===
- Onapristone (AR-18, IVV-1001, ZK-299, ZK-98299) – progesterone receptor antagonist (antiprogestogen) for prostate cancer

== GnRH/gonadotropins ==
=== GnRH receptor antagonists ===
- Merigolix (HS-10518, NCE-403, SKI-2670, TU-2670) – small-molecule GnRH antagonist for endometriosis and uterine fibroids

=== Kisspeptin receptor agonists ===
- MVT-602 (RVT-602, TAK-448) – small-molecule kisspeptin receptor agonist for female infertility and hypogonadism

=== Neurokinin/tachykinin receptor antagonists ===
- Elinzanetant (BAY-3427080; GSK-1144814; NT-814) – small-molecule NK_{1} receptor and NK_{3} receptor antagonist for hot flashes and "sex hormone disorders"

== Mixed/combinations ==
=== Androgen and progesterone receptor modulators ===
- 11β-Methyl-19-nortestosterone dodecylcarbonate (CDB-4754) – dual androgen/anabolic steroid and progestin for use as a male birth control pill
- Dimethandrolone undecanoate (CDB-4521) – dual androgen/anabolic steroid and progestin for use as a male birth control pill

=== Androgen and estrogen receptor modulators ===
- Acolbifene/prasterone (Femivia) – selective estrogen receptor modulator and dehydroepiandrosterone supplement for hot flashes

=== Androgen, estrogen, and progesterone receptor modulators ===
- Ethinylestradiol/drospirenone/prasterone – estrogen, progestogen, and dehydroepiandrosterone combination for female birth control

== See also ==
- List of investigational drugs
- List of investigational PMS/PMDD drugs
