= ZB716 =

Chemical compound

Clinical data
- Other names: Fulvestrant-3-boronic acid; Fulvestrant-3-boronoate; 7α-[9-[(4,4,5,5,5-Pentafluoropentyl)-sulfinyl]nonyl]-3-(dihydroxy-boryl)estra-1,3,5(10)-trien-17β-ol
- Routes of administration: By mouth
- Drug class: Antiestrogen; Selective estrogen receptor degrader

Identifiers
- IUPAC name: [(7R,8R,9S,13S,14S,17S)-17-hydroxy-13-methyl-7-[9-(4,4,5,5,5-pentafluoropentylsulfinyl)nonyl]-6,7,8,9,11,12,14,15,16,17-decahydrocyclopenta[a]phenanthren-3-yl]boronic acid
- CAS Number: 1853279-29-4
- PubChem CID: 126480615
- UNII: E35ZN95LMT

Chemical and physical data
- Formula: C_{32}H_{48}BF_{5}O_{4}S
- Molar mass: 634.59 g·mol^{−1}
- 3D model (JSmol): Interactive image
- Melting point: 230 °C (446 °F) (decomposes)
- SMILES: B(C1=CC2=C(C=C1)[C@H]3CC[C@]4([C@H]([C@@H]3[C@@H](C2)CCCCCCCCCS(=O)CCCC(C(F)(F)F)(F)F)CC[C@@H]4O)C)(O)O
- InChI: InChI=1S/C32H48BF5O4S/c1-30-17-15-26-25-12-11-24(33(40)41)21-23(25)20-22(29(26)27(30)13-14-28(30)39)10-7-5-3-2-4-6-8-18-43(42)19-9-16-31(34,35)32(36,37)38/h11-12,21-22,26-29,39-41H,2-10,13-20H2,1H3/t22-,26-,27+,28+,29-,30+,43?/m1/s1; Key:FIAYIYKWRBIBQG-GDWZZRAASA-N

ZB716, also known as fulvestrant-3-boronic acid, is a synthetic, steroidal, orally active antiestrogen which is under development for the treatment of estrogen receptor (ER)-positive metastatic breast cancer. The drug is a silent antagonist of the ERα (IC_{50} = 4.1 nM) as well as a selective estrogen receptor degrader (SERD). It is an analogue and prodrug of fulvestrant in which the C3 hydroxyl group has been replaced with a boronic acid moiety. In accordance, the two drugs have similar pharmacodynamic properties. However, whereas fulvestrant is not orally active and must be administered via intramuscular injection, ZB716 is less susceptible to first-pass metabolism, and in relation to this, is orally active.

A single oral dose of 8.3 mg/kg ZB716 to mice has been found to result in an over 160 ng/mL (160,000 pg/mL) maximal concentration of the drug in circulation, a level far in excess of the 15.2 ng/mL (15,200 pg/mL) concentration achieved with subcutaneous injection of fulvestrant in mice. As such, not only may ZB716 be more convenient to administer in humans, it has far greater bioavailability compared to fulvestrant and hence may allow for greater systemic exposure and therapeutic benefit.

ZB716 produces fulvestrant as an active metabolite in vivo in mice, with approximately 10 to 15% of the drug being converted into it. As such, most of the effects are likely due to the parent drug.

== Clinical development ==
As of December 2020, it is in a phase I clinical trial for ER+/HER2- metastatic breast cancer.

== See also ==
- List of investigational sex-hormonal agents § Estrogenics
