= Dezandrodeg =

Clinical data
- Other names: AR-LDD; BMS-986365; BMS986365; CC-0094676; CC0094676; CC-94676; CC94676; CEL-007452; CEL007452
- Routes of administration: Oral
- Drug class: Antiandrogen; Androgen receptor antagonist; Androgen receptor degrader

Identifiers
- IUPAC name: 2-[(2R)-4-[2-[4-[3-[4-cyano-3-(trifluoromethyl)phenyl]-5,5-dimethyl-4-oxo-2-sulfanylideneimidazolidin-1-yl]-2-ethylphenoxy]ethyl]-2-methylpiperazin-1-yl]-N-[3-[(2,6-dioxopiperidin-3-yl)amino]phenyl]acetamide
- CAS Number: 2446928-30-7
- PubChem CID: 149429863
- IUPHAR/BPS: 14373
- ChemSpider: 129389593
- KEGG: D13217
- ChEBI: CHEBI:747790
- ChEMBL: ChEMBL6172473

Chemical and physical data
- Formula: C_{41}H_{45}F_{3}N_{8}O_{5}S
- Molar mass: 818.92 g·mol^{−1}
- 3D model (JSmol): Interactive image
- SMILES: CCC1=C(C=CC(=C1)N2C(=S)N(C(=O)C2(C)C)C3=CC(=C(C=C3)C#N)C(F)(F)F)OCCN4CCN([C@@H](C4)C)CC(=O)NC5=CC=CC(=C5)NC6CCC(=O)NC6=O
- InChI: InChI=1S/C41H45F3N8O5S/c1-5-26-19-31(52-39(58)51(38(56)40(52,3)4)30-10-9-27(22-45)32(21-30)41(42,43)44)11-13-34(26)57-18-17-49-15-16-50(25(2)23-49)24-36(54)47-29-8-6-7-28(20-29)46-33-12-14-35(53)48-37(33)55/h6-11,13,19-21,25,33,46H,5,12,14-18,23-24H2,1-4H3,(H,47,54)(H,48,53,55)/t25-,33?/m1/s1; Key:YUVGVJYLOFTILT-NHYGQJMQSA-N

Dezandrodeg (INN, USAN; developmental code names BMS-986365 and CC-94676) is an antiandrogen which is under development for the treatment of prostate cancer. It is taken orally. The drug acts as a dual androgen receptor antagonist and androgen receptor degrader. It is under development by Celgene Corporation and Bristol-Myers Squibb. As of June 2026, dezandrodeg is in phase 3 clinical trials for prostate cancer. It was also under development for the treatment of solid tumors, but no recent development has been reported.

== See also ==
- List of investigational sex-hormonal agents
