= Etacstil =

Chemical compound

Identifiers
- IUPAC name: (2E)-3-{4-[(1Z)-1,2-Diphenyl-1-buten-1-yl]phenyl}acrylic acid
- CAS Number: 155701-61-4
- PubChem CID: 5288494
- ChemSpider: 4450668
- UNII: WEM4BUT8FL
- ChEMBL: ChEMBL33899

Chemical and physical data
- Formula: C_{25}H_{22}O_{2}
- Molar mass: 354.449 g·mol^{−1}
- 3D model (JSmol): Interactive image
- SMILES: CC/C(=C(\c1ccccc1)/c2ccc(cc2)/C=C/C(=O)O)/c3ccccc3
- InChI: InChI=1S/C25H22O2/c1-2-23(20-9-5-3-6-10-20)25(21-11-7-4-8-12-21)22-16-13-19(14-17-22)15-18-24(26)27/h3-18H,2H2,1H3,(H,26,27)/b18-15+,25-23-; Key:HJQQVNIORAQATK-DDJBQNAASA-N

Etacstil (developmental code names GW-5638, DPC974) is an orally active, nonsteroidal, combined selective estrogen receptor modulator (SERM) and selective estrogen receptor degrader (SERD) that was developed for the treatment of estrogen receptor-positive breast cancer. It was shown to overcome antiestrogen (tamoxifen, aromatase inhibitor, fulvestrant) resistance in breast cancer by altering the shape of the estrogen receptor, thus exhibiting SERD properties. Etacstil is a tamoxifen derivative and one of the first drugs to overcome tamoxifen-resistance. It is the predecessor of GW-7604, of which etacstil is a prodrug (GW-7604 being the 4-hydroxy metabolite of etacstil). This is analogous to the case of tamoxifen being a prodrug of afimoxifene (4-hydroxytamoxifen).

Etacstil was developed in the early 1990s by Duke University, Glaxo Wellcome, and later, Dupont. In 2001, Bristol Myers-Squibb (BMS) acquired Dupont, and for non-scientific, corporate reasons, closed the trial and abandoned the release of etacstil and its metabolite GW-7604.

After many dormant years, a recent resurgence of interest in SERDs has led to the development of brilanestrant, a structural analogue of etacstil.

== See also ==
- Bazedoxifene
- Elacestrant
- Timeline of cancer treatment development
