= Receptor degrader =

A receptor degrader binds to a receptor and induces its breakdown, causing down-regulation of signaling of that receptor. It is distinct from the mechanism of action of receptor antagonists and inverse agonists, which reduce receptor signaling but do not cause receptor breakdown. Examples include selective estrogen receptor degraders and androgen receptor degraders, both developed for hormone-sensitive cancers.
