= Timeline of cancer treatment development =

This is a historical timeline of the development and progress of cancer treatments, which includes time of discovery, progress, and approval of the treatments.

== Ancient Era ==
Cancer was traditionally treated with surgery, heat, or herbal (chemical) therapies.

- 2600 BC – Egyptian physician Imhotep diagnosed several types of tumour and therapies for them. According to the Ebers medical papyrus, hard tumours were treated by placing a poultice near the tumour, followed by local incision.
- BC – Ancient Greeks, Romans, and Egyptians used heat to treat masses. Healers in ancient India used regional and whole-body hyperthermia as treatments.
- 2 AD – Ancient Greeks describe surgical treatment of cancer.

== Modern Era ==
=== 1800s ===
- 1820s – British Dr. James Arnott, "the father of modern cryosurgery", starts to use cryotherapy to freeze tumours in the treatment of breast and uterine cancers
- 1880s – American Dr. William Stewart Halsted develops radical mastectomy for breast cancer
- 1890s – German Dr. Westermark used localized hyperthermia to produce tumour regression in patients
- 1891 – American Dr. William B. Coley, "the father of immunotherapy", starts to treat cancer patients by injecting them with streptococci, containing immunostimulatory CpG motifs
- 1896 – French Dr. Victor Despeignes, "the father of radiation therapy", starts to use X-rays to treat cancer
- 1896 – American Dr. Emil Grubbe starts to treat breast cancer patients with X-rays
- 1896 Sir George Thomas Beatson invented hormonal treatment of breast cancer by bilateral ovary removal in women with inoperable breast cancer.

=== 1900s ===
- 1900 – Swedish Dr. Stenbeck cures a skin cancer with small doses of radiation
- 1920s – Dr. William B. Coley's immunotherapy treatment, regressed tumors in hundreds of cases, the success of Coley's Toxins attracted heavy resistance from his rival and supervisor, Dr. James Ewing, who was an ardent supporter of radiation therapy for cancer. This rivalry and opposition to Dr. Coley leads to the disuse of immunotherapy for cancer, in favor of Dr. Ewing's preferred radiation therapy
- 1939 – American Dr. Charles Huggins uses synthetic hormone therapy to treat prostate cancer
- 1942 – First chemotherapy drug mustine used to treat cancer
- 1947 – American Dr. Sidney Farber induces brief remission in a patient with leukaemia with the antifolate drug aminopterin (methotrexate)
- 1949 – US FDA approves mechlorethamine, a nitrogen mustard compound, for treatment of cancer
- 1949 – Oncolytic viruses began human clinical trials
- 1951 – Dr. Jane C. Wright demonstrated the use of the antifolate, methotrexate in solid tumors, showing remission in breast cancer
- 1950s – Anti-cancer anthracyclines isolated from the Streptomyces peucetius bacteria. Anthracycline-based derivatives include: daunorubicin, doxorubicin, amrubicin, idarubicin
- 1953 – US FDA approves mercaptopurine (6 MP), an immunosuppressive agent
- 1956 – Metastatic choriocarcinoma cancer is cured with the antifolate, methotrexate
- 1956 – First bone marrow transplantation performed by E. Donnall Thomas in order to treat leukemia in one of two identical twins, the healthy twin being the donor
- 1957 – Introduction of fluorouracil to treat colorectal, breast, stomach, and pancreatic cancers
- 1957 – Introduction of interferon to treat kidney, skin, and bladder cancer
- 1958 – Combination therapy consisting of 6-mercaptopurine and methotrexate results in a cure of leukaemia in a trial run in US hospitals
- 1958 – US FDA approves cyclophosphamide for chemotherapy of cancer
- 1960s – Introduction of laser therapy in treatment of cancer
- 1960 – Invention of tamoxifen breast cancer anti-estrogen (SERM) hormonal therapy drug
- 1961 – Vincristine, anti-cancer alkaloid, isolated from the Madagascar periwinkle plant
- 1962 – US FDA disapproves Dr. Coley's immunotherapy, making it illegal; radiation therapy remained the dominant treatment for cancer
- 1963 – US FDA approves vincristine (Oncovin) for chemotherapy of cancer
- 1964 – VAMP regimen combination therapy, consisting of: vincristine, amethopterin, 6-mercaptopurine, and prednisone, induces long-term remissions in juvenile acute lymphoblastic leukemia
- 1965 – MOPP regimen combination therapy cures advanced Hodgkin's lymphoma, with the combination of: nitrogen mustard, vincristine, procarbazine, and prednisone
- 1965 – MOMP regimen combination therapy, consisting of: methotrexate, vincristine, 6-MP, and prednisone, induces long-term remissions in juvenile acute lymphoblastic leukemia
- 1965 – Latvian scientist Aina Muceniece identifies echovirus as a potential agent for oncolytic virotherapy, resulting in the development of RIGVIR
- 1966 – Taxol, anti-cancer compound, isolated from the yew plant
- 1967 – Camptothecin, anti-cancer compound, isolated from the Camptotheca acuminata, the Chinese Happy Tree, which was used as a cancer treatment in traditional Chinese medicine. It is the source of chemotherapy drugs: topotecan and irinotecan.
- 1968 – Japanese Dr. Tanaka pioneers the treatment of metastatic breast cancer with cryoablation, resulting in prolonged survival
- 1972 – UK and other European countries approve tamoxifen for breast cancer
- 1972 – American Dr. Lawrence Einhorn cures metastatic testicular cancer with cisplatin
- 1975 – Invention of monoclonal antibodies
- 1975 – American Dr. Einhorn shows combination therapy consisting of cisplatinum, vinblastine, and bleomycin can cure 70% of advanced testicular cancer cases
- 1975 – C-MOPP regimen combination therapy, consisting of: methotrexate, vincristine, cyclophosphamide, and prednisone, cured advanced diffuse large B-cell lymphoma
- 1977 – US FDA approves tamoxifen for metastatic breast cancer only, not widely popular as chemotherapy remains first line of treatment
- 1981 – American Dr. Bernard Fisher proves lumpectomy is as effective as mastectomy for breast cancer
- 1989 – US FDA approves Carboplatin, a derivative of cisplatin, for chemotherapy
- 1990 – US FDA approves tamoxifen for major additional use to help prevent the recurrence of cancer in "node-negative" patients
- 1990 – China begins treating various cancers with photodynamic therapy
- 1991 – First gene therapy treatment of cancer (melanoma)
- 1992 – Invention of tyrosine-kinase inhibitor Imatinib
- 1992 – Invention of Etacstil breast cancer anti-estrogen (SERM/SERD) hormonal therapy drug that overcomes hormone-therapy resistance
- 1996 – US FDA approves antiestrogen, aromatase inhibitor Anastrozole for advanced breast cancer
- 1996 – Russia begins treating various cancers with photodynamic therapy
- 1997 – First monoclonal antibody, Rituximab, is licensed
- 1997 – Chinese doctors start treating uterine fibroids, liver cancer, breast cancer, pancreatic cancer, bone tumours, and renal cancer with ultrasound imaging-guided high-intensity focused ultrasound
- 1998 – Chinese doctors start treating breast, kidney, lung, liver, prostate and bone cancer with imaging-guided cryoablation
- 1998 – US FDA approves herceptin, a monoclonal antibody for HER2 metastatic breast cancer
- 1998 – US FDA approves cryoablation for the treatment of prostate cancer
- 1998 – US FDA approves Camptothecin-analogue irinotecan for chemotherapy of cancer
- 1998 – US FDA approves tamoxifen to reduce breast cancer risk in high-risk patients
- 1998 – US FDA approves monoclonal antibody, Trastuzumab for advanced HER-2 breast cancer
- 1998 – Imaging-guided High-intensity focused ultrasound is approved for use in Europe for treatment of cancer

=== 2000s ===
- 2001 – UK NICE approves taxol for chemotherapy of breast, ovarian, and non-small cell lung cancers
- 2002 – US FDA approves imatinib
- 2002 – The State Food and Drug Administration of China approves Gendicine, gene therapy for cancer
- 2002 – Corporate takeover of Dupont by BMS resulted in abandoning Etacstil breast cancer anti-estrogen (SERM/SERD) hormonal therapy drug that overcomes hormone-therapy resistance
- 2003 – American Dr. Peter Littrup starts to treat early and metastatic breast cancer with cryoablation
- 2004 – bevacizumab, the first approved drug to inhibit blood vessel formation by tumours, is licensed
- 2005 – US FDA approves taxol for chemotherapy of breast, pancreatic, and non-small cell lung cancers
- 2006 – US FDA approves herceptin
- 2007 – US FDA approves sorafenib
- 2007 – US FDA approves camptothecin-analogue topotecan for chemotherapy of cancer
- 2010 – US FDA approves immunotherapy, sipuleucel-T dendritic cell vaccine for advanced prostate cancer
- 2010 – China advances cryoimmunotherapy to treat breast, kidney, lung, liver, prostate and bone cancer
- 2011 – US FDA approves monoclonal antibody, Ipilimumab for advanced melanoma
- 2011 – Cuba develops and releases CimaVax-EGF, the first therapeutic cancer vaccine for lung cancer
- 2012 – Cuba develops and releases monoclonal antibody, Racotumomab, the therapeutic cancer vaccine for lung cancer
- 2015 – US FDA approves anti-CDK4/6, Palbociclib for advanced breast cancer
- 2015 – US FDA approves imaging-guided high-intensity focused ultrasound for prostate cancer

== See also ==
- Treatment of cancer
- History of cancer chemotherapy
