= C25H25Cl2FN2O2 =

The molecular formula C_{25}H_{25}Cl_{2}FN_{2}O_{2} (molar mass: 475.39 g/mol) may refer to:

- (R)-Ketoprofen
- Taragarestrant
