= Rosolutamide =

Clinical data
- Other names: ASC-JM-17; ASC-JM17; JM17; ALZ-003; ALZ003

Identifiers
- IUPAC name: (1E,6E)-4-(cyclobutylmethyl)-1,7-bis(3,4-dimethoxyphenyl)hepta-1,6-diene-3,5-dione
- CAS Number: 1039760-91-2
- PubChem CID: 25183127
- DrugBank: DB16931
- ChemSpider: 64854816
- UNII: 5VLL140BN9
- ChEMBL: ChEMBL5266600

Chemical and physical data
- Formula: C_{28}H_{32}O_{6}
- Molar mass: 464.558 g·mol^{−1}
- 3D model (JSmol): Interactive image
- SMILES: COC1=C(C=C(C=C1)/C=C/C(=O)C(C(=O)/C=C/C2=CC(=C(C=C2)OC)OC)CC3CCC3)OC
- InChI: InChI=1S/C28H32O6/c1-31-25-14-10-20(17-27(25)33-3)8-12-23(29)22(16-19-6-5-7-19)24(30)13-9-21-11-15-26(32-2)28(18-21)34-4/h8-15,17-19,22H,5-7,16H2,1-4H3/b12-8+,13-9+; Key:PJOSHEDKRPRCAE-QHKWOANTSA-N

Rosolutamide (INN; developmental code name ASC-JM17, JM17, ALZ-003) is an agonist of Nuclear factor erythroid 2-related factor 1 and Nuclear factor erythroid 2-related factor 2 , a nonsteroidal antiandrogen, and an androgen receptor degrader related to curcumin. Other analogues like dimethylcurcumin (ASC-J9) are also known.

== See also ==
- List of investigational sex-hormonal agents § Androgenics
