= Palazestrant =

Chemical compound

Clinical data
- Other names: OP-1250

Identifiers
- IUPAC name: (1R,3R)-2-(2-fluoro-2-methyl-propyl)-3-methyl-1-[4-(1-propylazetidin-3-yl)oxyphenyl]-1,3,4,9-tetrahydropyrido[3,4-b]indole
- CAS Number: 2092925-89-6
- PubChem CID: 135351887
- DrugBank: DB18971
- ChemSpider: 128922074
- UNII: VU35KM56Q4
- KEGG: D12827
- ChEMBL: ChEMBL5314475

Chemical and physical data
- Formula: C_{28}H_{36}FN_{3}O
- Molar mass: 449.614 g·mol^{−1}
- 3D model (JSmol): Interactive image
- SMILES: CCCN1CC(C1)OC2=CC=C(C=C2)[C@@H]3C4=C(C[C@H](N3CC(C)(C)F)C)C5=CC=CC=C5N4
- InChI: InChI=1S/C28H36FN3O/c1-5-14-31-16-22(17-31)33-21-12-10-20(11-13-21)27-26-24(23-8-6-7-9-25(23)30-26)15-19(2)32(27)18-28(3,4)29/h6-13,19,22,27,30H,5,14-18H2,1-4H3/t19-,27-/m1/s1; Key:LBSFUBLFDCAEKV-XHCCPWGMSA-N

Palazestrant is an investigational new drug which is being evaluated for the treatment of estrogen receptor-positive (ER+) breast cancer, with a dual mechanism of action as both a complete estrogen receptor antagonist (CERAN) and a selective estrogen receptor degrader (SERD). This orally bioavailable small molecule has demonstrated potent activity against both wild-type and mutant forms of the estrogen receptor.

== See also ==
- Substituted β-carboline
