= BPI-16350 =

Chemical compound

Clinical data
- Other names: BPI16350

Legal status
- Legal status: Investigational

Identifiers
- IUPAC name: N-[5-[(4-Ethylpiperazin-1-yl)methyl]pyridin-2-yl]-5-fluoro-4-(6-fluoro-1-methyl-1,2,3,4-tetrahydropyrido[1,2-a]benzimidazol-8-yl)pyrimidin-2-amine
- CAS Number: 2231158-58-8
- PubChem CID: 135181567
- ChemSpider: 129432005

Chemical and physical data
- Formula: C_{28}H_{32}F_{2}N_{8}
- Molar mass: 518.617 g·mol^{−1}
- 3D model (JSmol): Interactive image
- SMILES: CCN1CCN(CC1)CC2=CN=C(C=C2)NC3=NC=C(C(=N3)C4=CC5=C(C(=C4)F)N=C6N5C(CCC6)C)F
- InChI: InChI=1S/C28H32F2N8/c1-3-36-9-11-37(12-10-36)17-19-7-8-24(31-15-19)33-28-32-16-22(30)26(35-28)20-13-21(29)27-23(14-20)38-18(2)5-4-6-25(38)34-27/h7-8,13-16,18H,3-6,9-12,17H2,1-2H3,(H,31,32,33,35); Key:XOJPAVACYRFOBK-UHFFFAOYSA-N

BPI-16350 is a small molecule CDK4/6 inhibitor that is being studied for the treatment of cancer. It has a similar structure to abemaciclib but is more selective for CDK4/6 over CDK9 according to preclinical research.
