= Brilanestrant =

Discontinued oral cancer remedy

Clinical data
- Other names: GDC-0810, ARN-810, RG-6046, RO-7056118
- Routes of administration: Oral

Identifiers
- IUPAC name: (2E)-3-{4-[(1E)-2-(2-chloro-4-fluorophenyl)-1-(1H-indazol-5-yl)but-1-en-1-yl]phenyl}prop-2-enoic acid
- CAS Number: 1365888-06-7
- PubChem CID: 56941241
- ChemSpider: 35308225
- UNII: 9MM2R1A06R
- KEGG: D11264
- CompTox Dashboard (EPA): DTXSID701336037

Chemical and physical data
- Formula: C_{26}H_{20}ClFN_{2}O_{2}
- Molar mass: 446.91 g·mol^{−1}
- 3D model (JSmol): Interactive image
- SMILES: CCC(=C(C1=CC=C(C=C1)C=CC(=O)O)C2=CC3=C(C=C2)NN=C3)C4=C(C=C(C=C4)F)Cl
- InChI: InChI=1S/C26H20ClFN2O2/c1-2-21(22-10-9-20(28)14-23(22)27)26(18-8-11-24-19(13-18)15-29-30-24)17-6-3-16(4-7-17)5-12-25(31)32/h3-15H,2H2,1H3,(H,29,30)(H,31,32)/b12-5+,26-21+; Key:BURHGPHDEVGCEZ-KJGLQBJMSA-N

Brilanestrant (INN; developmental codes GDC-0810, ARN-810, RG-6046, and RO-7056118) is a nonsteroidal combined selective estrogen receptor modulator (SERM) and selective estrogen receptor degrader (SERD) that was discovered by Aragon Pharmaceuticals and was under development by Genentech for the treatment of locally advanced or metastatic estrogen receptor (ER)-positive breast cancer.

Development of brilanestrant was discontinued by Roche in April 2017. It reached phase II clinical trials for the treatment of breast cancer prior to the discontinuation of its development.

== Mechanism of action ==
Similarly to tamoxifen, a SERM, brilanestrant shows some capacity to activate the ER in certain contexts and possesses weak estrogenic activity in the rat uterus, and unlike fulvestrant, which is currently the only SERD to have been marketed, brilanestrant is not a steroid and is orally bioavailable and does not need to be administered by intramuscular injection. Brilanestrant has been found to be active in tamoxifen- and fulvestrant-resistant in vitro models of human breast cancer. Side effects observed in clinical studies of brilanestrant thus far have included diarrhea, nausea, and fatigue of mostly mild-to-moderate severity.

Brilanestrant is a structural analogue of etacstil, an earlier combined SERM and SERD that was abandoned in 2001 for commercial reasons.

== See also ==
- Bazedoxifene
- Elacestrant
