= Non steroidal aromatase inhibitors =

Non-Steroidal Aromatase Inhibitors (NSAIs) are one of two categories of aromatase inhibitors (AIs). AIs are divided into two categories, steroidal aromatase inhibitors (SAIs, type 1 inhibitors) and non-steroidal aromatase inhibitors (type 2 inhibitors) that is based on their mechanism of action and structure. NSAIs are mainly used to treat breast cancer in women. NSAIs binding is a reversible process where NSAIs binds to the aromatase enzyme through non-covalent interactions. When aromatase inhibitors (AIs) are used to treat breast cancer the main target is the aromatase enzyme which is responsible for the high estrogen level.

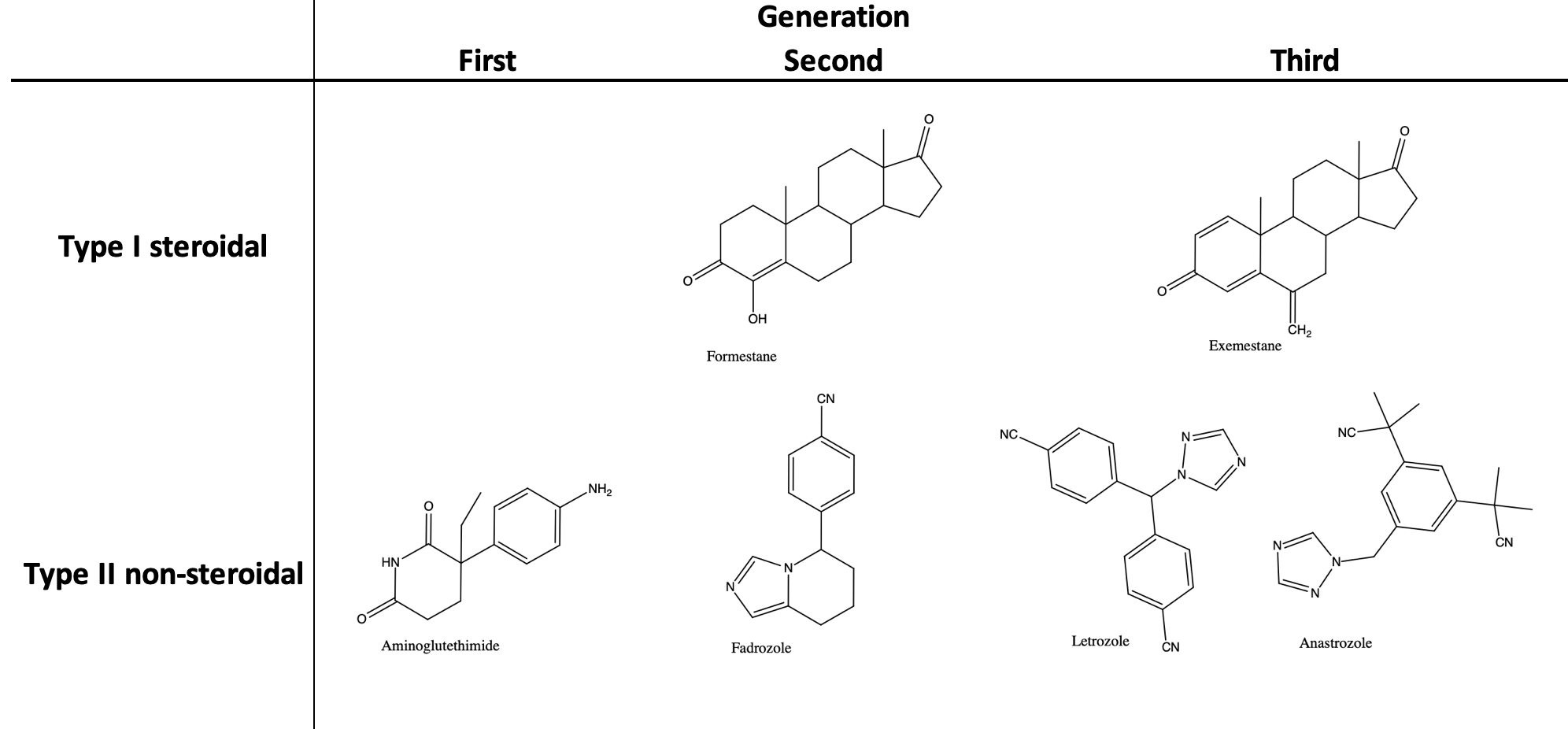
Classification of aromatase inhibitors

== Medical use ==
=== Cancer ===
NSAIs are used to treat hormone-dependent breast cancer. If almost all cancer cells express either estrogen or progesterone receptors it is a possibility that anti-estrogen treatment will work. If there are more hormone receptors on the cancer cells then the treatment is more likely to be efficient. The receptors need estrogen and progesterone to grow and when the hormones are not present the cancer cell gets no message to proliferate and can possibly die. AIs inhibit the enzyme aromatase that converts testosterone to estrogen and that is used clinically in treatments of breast cancer in postmenopausal women. Currently, two types of NSAIs are used for breast cancer, anastrozole and letrozole. They are used as first-line therapy in metastatic breast cancer and also in adjuvant treatment.

=== Ovulation induction ===
The NSAI, letrozole is also used for ovulation induction in women with polyendocrine metabolic ovarian syndrome (PMOS). Generally, clomiphene citrate is used to induce ovulation, but for some women that treatment is unsuccessful or resistant occurs. In those cases, letrozole has been used because it blocks estrogen and therefore reduces negative estrogen feedback at the pituitary gland. The release of follicle-stimulating hormone (FSH) from the pituitary gland is decreased because estrogen maintains negative feedback on the hypothalamic-pituitary axis. When estrogen production is blocked by inhibition of the aromatase, it releases the hypothalamic-pituitary axis from the estrogenic negative feedback. Thus, increasing the FSH secretion and stimulates the progress of ovarian follicles. Therefore, NSAIs in women with PMOS contribute a prominent effect. Studies have shown that letrozole does not have adverse anti-estrogen-like effects on endometrial thickness and cervical mucus which seems to be explained by a short half-life. Letrozole seems to be just as effective as clomiphene citrate for ovulation and pregnancy rate as it has shown to be very effective both in terms of ovulation rate and live birth rate.

=== Other uses ===
Aminoglutethimide is an NSAIs and therefore inhibits aromatase among other biosynthesis and is for example used to treat absence seizures, Cushing's syndrome, postmenopausal breast cancer and prostate cancer

== Adverse Effects ==
The first aromatase inhibitor that was discovered was aminoglutethimide, classified as first-generation AIs. It is still used today despite causing side effects such as lack of target enzyme specificity which also has effects on other cytochrome P450 enzymes. Furthermore, it affects the synthesis of aldosterone, thyroid hormone and cortisol. Clinically, aminoglutethimide has caused undesirable central nervous system side effects for example ataxia, lethargy and dizziness. Later generations, second and third were developed with the aim of higher potency, safety and selectivity. They inhibit aromatase specifically but not other biosynthesis like the first-generation, therefore many adverse effects are avoided. Generally, they are well tolerated and have few serious adverse effects. There are some common adverse effects like flushing, headache, musculoskeletal pain and vaginal dryness.

== Pharmacology ==
=== Aromatase ===
Chemical structure of the endogenous androstenedione. In the human body, the enzyme aromatase converts androstenedione to estrogen.

Aromatase is an enzyme that belongs to the cytochrome P450 family located on chromosome 15. In the human body, the aromatase consists of 10 β-strands (1 major sheet and 3 minor sheets) and 12 α-helixes. Its function is to catalyze the final step of estrogen synthesis which is the aromatization of androgen to estrogen. To be more specific it involves hydroxylation which uses NADPH as a donor for electrons and a C-19 methyl group is removed, which leads to the creation of aromatic ring.

=== Binding site and binding ===
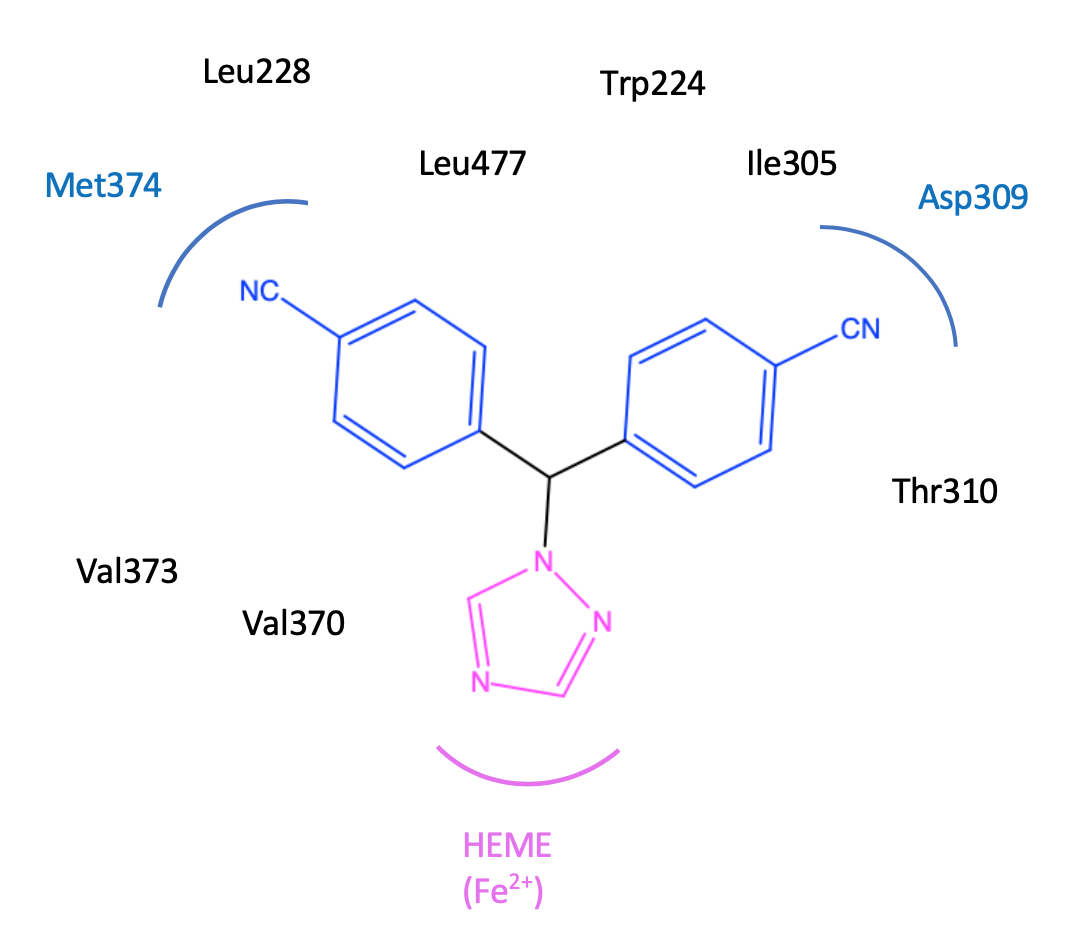
A general letrozole pharmacophore model. Interaction between letrozole and amino acids in the binding site on the aromatase enzyme. 1,2,4 triazole ring binds to heme moiety. The cyano benzyl moiety is significant because it acts as carbonyl group of endogenous androstenedione.

The active binding site of the aromatase enzyme is a subunit with a heme moiety (Fe^{2+}). This heme moiety is in relation to the β-face that the natural hormone androstenedione coordinates with. The structure of androstenedione contains two ketones that form hydrogen bonds with the amino acids, Asp^{309} and Met^{374}. Also, in the active binding site the 17-ketone group interacts with the amino acid, Arg^{115}. Additionally, at the binding site, androstenedione make Van der Waals forces with several amino acids, more specifically Arg^{115}, Ile^{133}, Phe^{134}, Phe^{221}, Trp^{224}, Ala^{306}, Thr^{310}, Val^{370}, Val^{373}, Met^{374}and Leu^{477}.

The binding of the NSAIs depends on the binding site of the aromatase as it has to fit into the substrate-binding site of the aromatase enzyme. NSAIs are not as specific as SAIs and therefore other enzymes may be inhibited which also have cytochrome P450 groups. It has been possible to develop selective drugs against cytochrome P450 aromatase where the amino acid sequence of the P450 arom is well defined from other members of the P450 cytochrome family, resulting in more specific inhibition of the aromatase. The binding of NSAIs to the aromatase is non-covalent and reversible. NSAIs are competitive inhibitors and when they disconnect from the active binding site the inhibition of the aromatase stops. Therefore, a continuous amount of NSAIs is required to inhibit aromatase. Third-generation NSAIs have a profitable positioned triazole group and a flat aromatic ring, that has a good fit to the binding site of aromatase. The triazole group coordinates with the heme group (Fe^{2+}) at the active binding site of the aromatase enzyme and potently inhibits the hydroxylation that aromatase is responsible for.

=== Mechanism of action ===
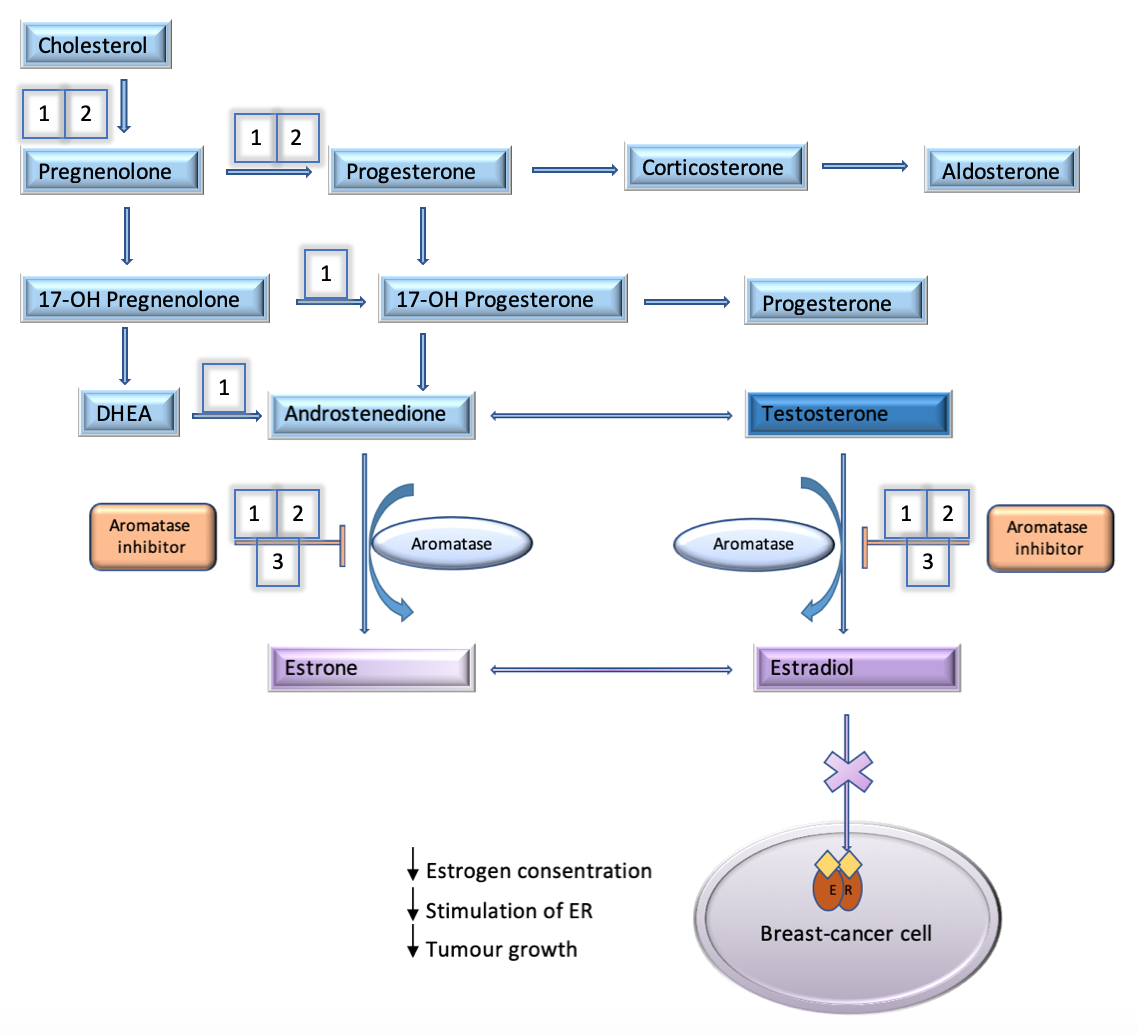
Metabolic pathways of estrogen production, along with the mechanism of action of NSAIs. ER- estrogen receptor, DHEA- dehydroepiandrosterone, 1- first generation NSAIs, 2- second generation NSAIs and 3- third generation NSAIs.

Estrogen is a sex-hormone that plays a major role in women's body function. Estrogen also plays a major role in stimulating breast cancer as it binds and activates the estrogen receptor (ER). When the ER is activated it activates other genes that are responsible for multiple actions of the breast cancer. Activated ER has an effect on cellular division, protease activity, inhibition of cell death and formation of new blood vessels. Aromatase inhibitors affect the ability of estrogens production from androgens by inhibiting the aromatase enzyme activity which is a part of the estrogen pathway. The two categories of AIs are based on their mechanism of action and structure. The three generations of NSAIs inhibit estrogen production in various places in the metabolic pathway. These generations all have in common that they inhibit the aromatase enzyme that is responsible for the conversion of testosterone and androstenedione to estradiol and estrone. The first- and second-generation of NSAIs, aminoglutethimide and fadrozole also have a reducing effect on the production of aldosterone and cortisol. Third-generation, anastrozole and letrozole are very selective, they only inhibit the aromatase enzyme and do not have an effect on other steroidogenic pathways. Mechanism of NSAIs is a reversible binding process where NSAIs binds to the aromatase enzyme through non-covalent interactions. NSAIs do not destroy the enzyme like SAIs do. An interaction occurs with a heme group of cytochrome P450 in the aromatase enzyme.

=== Pharmacokinetics ===
Pharmacokinetic properties for NSAIs are variable.

Aminoglutethimide has an oral administration and a usual dosage range between 250 and 100 mg/day. The drug has good oral bioavailability, it absorbs rapidly and completely. Aminoglutethimide has a good distribution around the body and is partly metabolized in the liver by acetylation. The elimination half-life of the drug is 12,5 hours and 34-54% of the drug is excreted unchanged in the urine.

Anastrozole is administered orally and has a standard daily dose of 1 mg. Anastrozole has good oral bioavailability and is rapidly absorbed. It takes 2–3 hours for the drug to reach maximum serum concentration. It has been shown that the ingestion of food does not significantly influence the plasma concentration of the drug at a steady-state. It takes 7 days of treatment to reach 90-95% of the steady-state serum concentration. Anastrozole distributes completely around the body and only 40% of the drug is bound to plasma proteins. The elimination of anastrozole is slow and the elimination half-life is 40–50 hours. Most of the drug dose is excreted in the urine but some part is excreted in feces. The largest part of the drug dose is metabolized and less than 10% is excreted unchanged. The liver is the main site of drug metabolism and the drug is metabolized by glucuronidation, hydroxylation and N-dealkylation. The metabolites are mainly excreted in the urine.

Letrozole has a standard daily dose of 2,5 mg and the drug has around 99,9% oral bioavailability. That means that the drug is absorbed fast and entirely. Intake of food does not affect the extent of absorption, but it has a small reducing effect on the rate of absorption. It takes 2–6 weeks of treatment to reach 90-95% of the steady-state serum concentration. Letrozole distributes rapidly around the body and is thoroughly distributed to tissues. Around 60% of the drug is bound to plasma proteins, especially albumin (55%). The elimination of letrozole is very slow and the elimination half-life is approximately 2 days. The main route of elimination of the drug is metabolism in the liver to the pharmacologically inactive metabolite carbinol. Caused by the cytochrome P450 isoenzymes 3A4 and 2A6. There is also the metabolism of the drug to other unknown metabolites.

== Synthesis ==
The synthesis of NSAIs is completed in numerous ways, for example, the synthesis of the most potent drug of NSAIs letrozole was acknowledged by Bowman et al. They described two synthesis methods, the first method had a serious limitation because of a detectable amount of undesirable isomer present. The second method uses n-butyllithium that is corrosive and harmful substance, therefore, it needs a certain storage, treatment and discarding. For example, the synthesis of letrozole that takes 60 minutes gives a yield of 80%, begins with 4-cyanobenzyl bromide followed by alkylation of triazole. The latter step is carbanion generation and nucleophilic aromatic substitution.

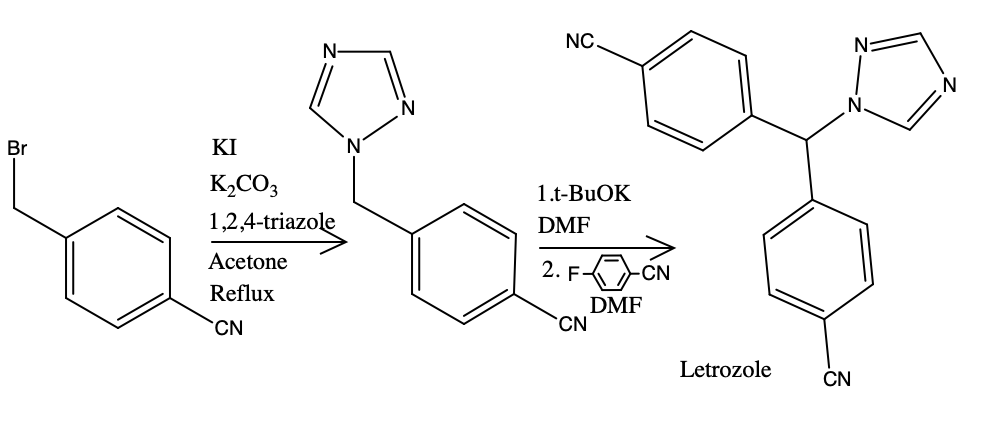
Example of synthesis of letrozole

== Structure and function ==
=== Structure-activity relationship (SAR) ===
Differences in efficacy of NSAIs
	Inhibition (%)
First-generation	
Aminoglutethimide	91
Second-generation	
Fadrozole	82
Vorozole	93
Third-generation	
Letrozole	99
Anastrozole	97

In general NSAIs have azole ring system like imidazole and triazole attached to planar aromatic structures. Heterocyclic nitrogen atom is an important factor for NSAIs structure-activity relationship as it interacts with heme iron of the P450 enzymes which inhibit hydroxylation reactions for aromatization. Other parts of the structure interact with the apoprotein moiety of the active binding site on the aromatase enzyme. The combination of binding to the heme group and the active site results in great effect and specific features.

The most effective NSAIs are azole derivatives, they have a high affinity for the aromatase enzyme. There are azole derivatives containing imidazole ring such as fadrozole and liarozole together with derivatives containing 1,2,4 triazole ring such as letrozole, anastrozole and vorozole. The effect of 1,2,3-triazole instead of 1,2,4-triazole has been examined in the letrozole structure. It has shown that the position of the nitrogen atom in either position 3 or 4 of the 1,2,4 triazole is important for good inhibition of aromatase. The derivatives containing triazole ring are used as first-line NSAIs, and they are all well tolerated, selective and highly effective. The most effective aromatase inhibitor is letrozole; it can inhibit 99% of the aromatase enzyme in peripheral tissues.

Some studies have shown that the selectivity of NSAIs can be increased with a change of the triazole system with bioisosteres and also by enhancing the aromatic structures in the side chain. It has been demonstrated that the arrangement of imidazole or imidazole-methyl ring could give better inhibition than triazole, tetrazole or other azoles. Additionally, NSAIs that contain 4-pyridylmethyl group is considered more effective than others.

Letrozole has a 1,2,4 triazole ring which is important for binding with Fe^{2+} in the heme moiety of the aromatase enzyme. Also, the cyano benzyl moiety is significant because it partly imitates the steroid backbone of the natural hormone androstenedione. The cyano groups are at the para position of the benzonitrile, they are electron-withdrawing and that is important for the activity as it acts as carbonyl group of androstenedione. Two aryl groups also play an important role in the inhibition.

=== Quantitative structure activity relationship (QSAR) ===
QSAR models have been made to figure out the most-valuable structural and physicochemical parameters for NSAIs inhibitory activity. These models demonstrate a precise understanding of NSAIs effectiveness. Dipole moment and molar refractivity are considered to be the most meaningful physicochemical properties that affect the inhibition of aromatase. This implies that bulky, complex, flexible and steric characteristic of molecules is important. Also, often the hydrophobic properties matter. Thereby, NSAIs activity is mostly dependent on the size and shape of the drug structure along with steric characteristics and interaction of the azole group to the heme prosthetic group.

== History ==
=== Independent work leading to initial discovery ===
Classification of aromatase inhibitors
Inhibitors
Generation	Type I (steroidal)	Type II (non-steroidal)
First	Testololactone	Aminoglutethimide
Second	Formestane	Fadrozole
Third	Exemestane	Anastrozole
		Letrozole

In the 1920s the initial discovery of estrogens and the bioactivity in urinary extracts contributed the momentum for greater understanding of the structure, biosynthesis, secretion, and the function of the various estrogens. This was mainly due to the independent work of Edward Doisy and Adolf Butenandt who isolated estriol, estrone, and estradiol from urine of pregnant women. By blocking biosynthesis using drugs, it has been seen that employing agents that specifically affect estrogen production has shown the highest promise. Thus, by creating an aromatic ring in the steroid molecule the final step in the pathway of estrogen biosynthesis is inhibited, and this gave rise to the trivial name of aromatase for the enzyme catalyzing this reaction. In 1960 aminoglutethimide was marketed as an anticonvulsant. Later in 1963, a doctor at the Sinai Hospital in Detroit proclaimed that it produced increased symptoms of Addison's disease. With more lab work it was discovered that it had a blocking effect on steroidal biosynthesis. Later on, in the 1970s it was used in women with breast cancer.

=== Subdivision of Aromatase inhibitors ===
Aromatase inhibitors have been distinctively sub-divided into two main groups due to their difference in mechanism of action and structure. Type I inhibitors that are steroidal aromatase inhibitors and type II inhibitors that are non-steroidal aromatase inhibitors. The evolution of aromatase inhibitors has progressively increased in potency and specificity with each generation from discovery.

The progression has been necessary as the first-generation of drug-induced inhibitors of the enzyme were not particularly potent and lacked specificity that would often produce side effects unrelated to estrogen deprivation. Thus, development from first-generation to third-generation has given remarkable specificity and potency.

=== Drug development for specific treatment ===
Initial studies on estrogen and its enzymatic activity and function was a component of the birth control pill. Investigations showed that inhibition of the enzyme might have extensive practical application for treatment of hormone-dependent breast cancer, alterations of ovarian and endometrial function, and treatment of benign disorders such as gynecomastia. The unraveling of aromatase enzyme varied function has thus shown an extensive success in the field of endocrinology concerning breast cancer therapy. They have provided one of the first molecular targets for rational drug development in the treatment of cancer.

== See also ==
- Aromatase inhibitors
- Steroidal aromatase inhibitors
