= Merigolix =

Clinical data
- Other names: HS-10518; NCE-403; SKI-2670; TU-2670
- Routes of administration: Oral
- Drug class: GnRH antagonist

Identifiers
- IUPAC name: 4-[[(1R)-2-[1-[[2-fluoro-6-(trifluoromethyl)phenyl]methyl]-2,4-dioxo-1'-[[5-(trifluoromethyl)furan-2-yl]methyl]spiro[7H-furo[3,4-d]pyrimidine-5,4'-piperidine]-3-yl]-1-phenylethyl]amino]butanoic acid
- CAS Number: 1454272-94-6
- PubChem CID: 71727383
- ChemSpider: 128922028
- UNII: RS62JYV9LX
- ChEMBL: ChEMBL5314469

Chemical and physical data
- Formula: C_{36}H_{35}F_{7}N_{4}O_{6}
- Molar mass: 752.687 g·mol^{−1}
- 3D model (JSmol): Interactive image
- SMILES: C1CN(CCC12C3=C(CO2)N(C(=O)N(C3=O)C[C@@H](C4=CC=CC=C4)NCCCC(=O)O)CC5=C(C=CC=C5F)C(F)(F)F)CC6=CC=C(O6)C(F)(F)F
- InChI: InChI=1S/C36H35F7N4O6/c37-26-9-4-8-25(35(38,39)40)24(26)19-46-28-21-52-34(13-16-45(17-14-34)18-23-11-12-29(53-23)36(41,42)43)31(28)32(50)47(33(46)51)20-27(22-6-2-1-3-7-22)44-15-5-10-30(48)49/h1-4,6-9,11-12,27,44H,5,10,13-21H2,(H,48,49)/t27-/m0/s1; Key:LJPSGSMPGVITHK-MHZLTWQESA-N

Merigolix (INN; developmental code names HS-10518, NCE-403, SKI-2670, TU-2670) is a gonadotropin releasing hormone (GnRH) antagonist which is under development for the treatment of endometriosis and uterine fibroids. It is taken by mouth. The drug is being developed by TiumBio, Daewon Pharmaceutical, and Jiangsu Hansoh Pharmaceutical. As of October 2024, it is in phase 2 clinical trials for both endometriosis and uterine fibroids.

== See also ==
- List of investigational sex-hormonal agents
