= Acolbifene =

Chemical compound

Clinical data
- Other names: EM-652; SCH-57068
- Drug class: Selective estrogen receptor modulator

Identifiers
- IUPAC name: (2S)-3-(4-hydroxyphenyl)-4-methyl-2-[4-(2-piperidin-1-ylethoxy)phenyl]-2H-chromen-7-ol
- CAS Number: 252555-01-4
- PubChem CID: 155435
- ChemSpider: 136930
- UNII: KXC7811DBY
- ChEMBL: ChEMBL68055
- CompTox Dashboard (EPA): DTXSID501318411

Chemical and physical data
- Formula: C_{29}H_{31}NO_{4}
- Molar mass: 457.570 g·mol^{−1}
- 3D model (JSmol): Interactive image
- SMILES: CC1=C([C@@H](OC2=C1C=CC(=C2)O)C3=CC=C(C=C3)OCCN4CCCCC4)C5=CC=C(C=C5)O
- InChI: InChI=1S/C29H31NO4/c1-20-26-14-11-24(32)19-27(26)34-29(28(20)21-5-9-23(31)10-6-21)22-7-12-25(13-8-22)33-18-17-30-15-3-2-4-16-30/h5-14,19,29,31-32H,2-4,15-18H2,1H3/t29-/m0/s1; Key:DUYNJNWVGIWJRI-LJAQVGFWSA-N

Acolbifene (INN) (developmental code names EM-652, SCH-57068) is a nonsteroidal selective estrogen receptor modulator (SERM) which, as of 2015, is in phase III clinical trials for the treatment of breast cancer.

== See also ==
- Acolbifene/prasterone
- List of investigational sex-hormonal agents § Estrogenics
