= Gridegalutamide =

Chemical compound

Clinical data
- Other names: BMS-986365; CC-94676

Identifiers
- IUPAC name: 2-[(2R)-4-[2-[4-[3-[4-cyano-3-(trifluoromethyl)phenyl]-5,5-dimethyl-4-oxo-2-sulfanylideneimidazolidin-1-yl]-2-ethylphenoxy]ethyl]-2-methylpiperazin-1-yl]-N-[3-[[(3R)-2,6-dioxopiperidin-3-yl]amino]phenyl]acetamide
- CAS Number: 2446929-86-6
- PubChem CID: 153513643
- DrugBank: DB21593
- ChemSpider: 133326102
- UNII: VA228VR2DI
- KEGG: D12866
- ChEMBL: ChEMBL6068413

Chemical and physical data
- Formula: C_{41}H_{45}F_{3}N_{8}O_{5}S
- Molar mass: 818.92 g·mol^{−1}
- 3D model (JSmol): Interactive image
- SMILES: CCC1=C(C=CC(=C1)N2C(=S)N(C(=O)C2(C)C)C3=CC(=C(C=C3)C#N)C(F)(F)F)OCCN4CCN([C@@H](C4)C)CC(=O)NC5=CC=CC(=C5)N[C@@H]6CCC(=O)NC6=O
- InChI: InChI=1S/C41H45F3N8O5S/c1-5-26-19-31(52-39(58)51(38(56)40(52,3)4)30-10-9-27(22-45)32(21-30)41(42,43)44)11-13-34(26)57-18-17-49-15-16-50(25(2)23-49)24-36(54)47-29-8-6-7-28(20-29)46-33-12-14-35(53)48-37(33)55/h6-11,13,19-21,25,33,46H,5,12,14-18,23-24H2,1-4H3,(H,47,54)(H,48,53,55)/t25-,33-/m1/s1; Key:YUVGVJYLOFTILT-INJOXJOKSA-N

Gridegalutamide is an investigational oral androgen receptor (AR) degrader being developed for the treatment of metastatic castration-resistant prostate cancer (mCRPC). It belongs to a class of drugs called proteolysis targeting chimeras (PROTACs), which are designed to selectively degrade specific proteins by hijacking the ubiquitin-proteasome system. CC-94676 employs a unique dual mechanism of action, combining AR degradation with AR antagonism, potentially offering advantages over traditional AR inhibitors in overcoming resistance mechanisms. Initially developed by Celgene and now under Bristol Myers Squibb, CC-94676 has demonstrated AR protein degradation and suppression of tumor growth in CRPC mouse models. As of 2024, CC-94676 is being evaluated in phase I clinical trials for patients with mCRPC who have progressed on androgen deprivation therapy and at least one prior secondary hormonal therapy.
