= Bexirestrant =

Chemical compound

Clinical data
- Other names: SCO-120

Identifiers
- IUPAC name: (2S)-3-(3,5-difluorophenyl)-2-[4-[(E)-3-[3-(fluoromethyl)azetidin-1-yl]prop-1-enyl]phenyl]-4-methyl-2H-chromen-7-ol
- CAS Number: 2505067-70-7
- PubChem CID: 155770216
- ChemSpider: 115010413
- UNII: BB35H436NB
- ChEMBL: ChEMBL5095057

Chemical and physical data
- Formula: C_{29}H_{26}F_{3}NO_{2}
- Molar mass: 477.527 g·mol^{−1}
- 3D model (JSmol): Interactive image
- SMILES: CC1=C([C@@H](OC2=C1C=CC(=C2)O)C3=CC=C(C=C3)/C=C/CN4CC(C4)CF)C5=CC(=CC(=C5)F)F
- InChI: InChI=InChI=1S/C29H26F3NO2/c1-18-26-9-8-25(34)14-27(26)35-29(28(18)22-11-23(31)13-24(32)12-22)21-6-4-19(5-7-21)3-2-10-33-16-20(15-30)17-33/h2-9,11-14,20,29,34H,10,15-17H2,1H3/b3-2+/t29-/m0/s1; Key:DVZLOPUYTKPWHJ-MPWQXXDYSA-N

Bexirestrant is a selective estrogen receptor degrader (SERD) which is being evaluated for the treatment of breast cancer. This orally bioavailable compound has demonstrated potent activity against both wild-type and mutant forms of the estrogen receptor (ER), addressing a critical need in overcoming resistance to current endocrine therapies.

It is structurally characterized by an E-alkene linked to an azetidine core.
