= Imlunestrant =

Chemical compound

Clinical data
- Pronunciation: /ˌɪmlʊˈnɛstrənt/ IM-luu-NES-trənt
- Trade names: Inluriyo
- Other names: LY3484356, LY-3484356
- AHFS/Drugs.com: Monograph
- MedlinePlus: a625104
- License data: US DailyMed: Imlunestrant
- Routes of administration: By mouth
- Drug class: Estrogen receptor antagonist
- ATC code: None

Legal status
- Legal status: US: ℞-only; EU: Rx-only

Identifiers
- IUPAC name: (5R)-5-[4-[2-[3-(Fluoromethyl)azetidin-1-yl]ethoxy]phenyl]-8-(trifluoromethyl)-5H-chromeno[4,3-c]quinolin-2-ol
- CAS Number: 2408840-26-4; as tosylate: 2408840-41-3
- PubChem CID: 146603228
- DrugBank: DB19043
- ChemSpider: 115010421
- UNII: 9CXQ3PF69U; as tosylate: F7UDT90EW5
- KEGG: D12216; as tosylate: D12217
- ChEMBL: ChEMBL5095183

Chemical and physical data
- Formula: C_{29}H_{24}F_{4}N_{2}O_{3}
- Molar mass: 524.516 g·mol^{−1}
- 3D model (JSmol): Interactive image
- SMILES: C1C(CN1CCOC2=CC=C(C=C2)[C@@H]3C4=C5C=CC(=CC5=NC=C4C6=C(O3)C=C(C=C6)C(F)(F)F)O)CF
- InChI: InChI=1S/C29H24F4N2O3/c30-13-17-15-35(16-17)9-10-37-21-5-1-18(2-6-21)28-27-23-8-4-20(36)12-25(23)34-14-24(27)22-7-3-19(29(31,32)33)11-26(22)38-28/h1-8,11-12,14,17,28,36H,9-10,13,15-16H2/t28-/m1/s1; Key:UVBQMXOKKDCBJN-MUUNZHRXSA-N

Imlunestrant, sold under the brand name Inluriyo, is an anti-cancer medication used for the treatment of breast cancer. It is an estrogen receptor antagonist. It is used as the salt, imlunestrant tosylate. It is taken by mouth. It was developed by Eli Lilly and Company.

The most common adverse events and laboratory abnormalities include decreased hemoglobin, musculoskeletal pain, decreased calcium, decreased neutrophils, increased aspartate transaminase, fatigue, diarrhea, increased alanine transaminase, increased triglycerides, nausea, decreased platelets, constipation, increased cholesterol, and abdominal pain.

Imlunestrant was approved for medical use in the United States in September 2025, and in the European Union in January 2026.

== Medical uses ==
Imlunestrant is indicated for the treatment of adults with estrogen receptor-positive, human epidermal growth factor receptor 2-negative, estrogen receptor 1-mutated advanced or metastatic breast cancer with disease progression following at least one line of endocrine therapy.

In September 2026, the US indication for imlunestrant was expanded to be used in combination with abemaciclib for the treatment of adults with estrogen receptor-positive, human epidermal growth factor receptor 2-negative, ESR1-mutated locally advanced or metastatic breast cancer, as detected by an FDA-authorized test, with disease progression following at least one line of endocrine therapy.

== Adverse effects ==
The US prescribing information for imlunestrant includes warnings and precautions for embryo-fetal toxicity.

When used with abemaciclib, the US prescribing information for abemaciclib includes warnings and precautions for diarrhea, neutropenia, interstitial lung disease or pneumonitis, hepatotoxicity, venous thromboembolism, and embryo-fetal toxicity.

== History ==
Efficacy was evaluated in EMBER-3 (NCT04975308), a randomized, open-label, active-controlled, multi-center trial that enrolled 874 participants with estrogen receptor-positive, human epidermal growth factor receptor 2-negative locally advanced or metastatic breast cancer previously treated with an aromatase inhibitor either alone or in combination with a CDK4/6 inhibitor. Participants were excluded if they were eligible to receive a PARP inhibitor.

The US Food and Drug Administration granted the application for imlunestrant fast track designation.

== Society and culture ==
=== Legal status ===
Imlunestrant was approved for medical use in the United States in September 2025.

In November 2025, the Committee for Medicinal Products for Human Use of the European Medicines Agency adopted a positive opinion, recommending the granting of a marketing authorization for the medicinal product Inluriyo, intended for the treatment of adults with locally advanced or metastatic breast cancer with an activating ESR1-mutation. The applicant for this medicinal product is Eli Lilly Nederland B.V. Imlunestrant was authorized for medical use in the European Union in January 2026.

=== Names ===
Imlunestrant is the international nonproprietary name.

Imlunestrant is sold under the brand name Inluriyo.
