= Maintenance dose =

Amount of drug given to keep previously established blood level

In pharmacokinetics, a maintenance dose is the maintenance rate [mg/h] of drug administration equal to the rate of elimination at steady state. This is not to be confused with dose regimen, which is a type of drug therapy in which the dose [mg] of a drug is given at a regular dosing interval on a repetitive basis. Continuing the maintenance dose for about 4 to 5 half-lives (t_{1/2}) of the drug will approximate the steady state level. One or more doses higher than the maintenance dose can be given together at the beginning of therapy with a loading dose.

A loading dose is most useful for drugs that are eliminated from the body relatively slowly. Such drugs require only a small maintenance dose to maintain the drug at the appropriate level in the body, but without an initial higher dose, reaching that level would take a long time.

== Calculating the maintenance dose ==
The required maintenance dose may be calculated as:

$$\mbox{MD} = \frac{C_p CL}{F }$$

Where:

MD	is the maintenance dose rate [mg/h]
C_{p}	= desired peak concentration of drug [mg/L]
CL	= clearance of drug in body [L/h]
F	= bioavailability

For an intravenously administered drug, the bioavailability F will equal 1, since the drug is directly introduced to the bloodstream. If the patient requires an oral dose, bioavailability will be less than 1 (depending upon absorption, first pass metabolism etc.), requiring a larger loading dose.

== See also ==
- Therapeutic index
