= VOLT-02 =

Chemical compound

Clinical data
- Other names: Progesterone conjugate
- Drug class: Progestogen; Neurosteroid

Identifiers
- CAS Number: 2763338-59-4

VOLT-02 is a water-soluble conjugate of progesterone and a neurosteroid which is under development by Levolta Pharmaceuticals (formerly Voltarra Pharmaceuticals) for the treatment of traumatic brain injury, gynecological disorders, and menstrual disorders. As of March 2017, it is in phase II clinical trials for these indications. The chemical structure of VOLT-02 does not appear to have been released yet.

== See also ==
- List of neurosteroids § Inhibitory > Synthetic > Pregnanes
- List of progestogen esters § Oximes of progesterone derivatives
- List of investigational sex-hormonal agents § Progestogenics
