= Loading dose =

Amount of drug given to establish desired blood level

In pharmacokinetics, a loading dose is an initial higher dose of a drug that may be given at the beginning of a course of treatment before dropping down to a lower maintenance dose.

A loading dose is most useful for drugs that are eliminated from the body relatively slowly, i.e., which have a long systemic half-life. Such drugs need only a low maintenance dose in order to keep the amount of the drug in the body at the appropriate therapeutic level, but this also means that, without an initial higher dose, it would take a long time for the amount of the drug in the body to reach that level.

Drugs which may be started with an initial loading dose include digoxin, teicoplanin, voriconazole, procainamide and fulvestrant.

One or a series of doses may be given at the onset of therapy with the aim of achieving the target concentration rapidly.

== Worked example ==
For an example, one might consider the hypothetical drug foosporin. Suppose it has a long lifetime in the body, and only ten percent of it is cleared from the blood each day by the liver and kidneys. Suppose also that the drug works best when the total amount in the body is exactly one gram. So, the maintenance dose of foosporin is 100 milligrams (100 mg) per day—just enough to offset the amount cleared.

Suppose a patient just started taking 100 mg of foosporin every day.

- On the first day, they'd have 100 mg in their system; their body would clear 10 mg, leaving 90 mg.
- On the second day, the patient would have 190 mg in total; their body would clear 19 mg, leaving 171 mg.
- On the third day, they'd be up to 271 mg total; their body would clear 27 mg, leaving 244 mg.

As one can see, it would take many days for the total amount of drug within the body to come close to 1 gram (1000 mg) and achieve its full therapeutic effect.

For a drug such as this, a doctor might prescribe a loading dose of one gram to be taken on the first day. That immediately gets the drug's concentration in the body up to the therapeutically-useful level.

- First day: 1000 mg; the body clears 100 mg, leaving 900 mg.
- On the second day, the patient takes 100 mg, bringing the level back to 1000 mg; the body clears 100 mg overnight, still leaving 900 mg, and so forth.

== Calculating the loading dose ==
Four variables are used to calculate the loading dose:

C_{p}	= desired peak concentration of drug
V_{d}	= volume of distribution of drug in body
F	= bioavailability
S	= fraction of drug salt form which is active drug

The required loading dose may then be calculated as

$$\mbox{Loading dose} = \frac{C_p V_d}{F S}$$

For an intravenously administered drug, the bioavailability F will equal 1, since the drug is directly introduced to the bloodstream. If the patient requires an oral dose, bioavailability will be less than 1 (depending upon absorption, first pass metabolism etc.), requiring a larger loading dose.
