= Camizestrant =

Chemical compound

Clinical data
- Pronunciation: /ˌkæmɪˈzɛstrənt/ KAM-ih-ZES-trənt
- Trade names: Etcamah
- Other names: AZD9833
- AHFS/Drugs.com: Etcamah
- License data: US DailyMed: Camizestrant
- Routes of administration: By mouth
- Drug class: Antineoplastic
- ATC code: L02BA05 (WHO)

Legal status
- Legal status: CA: ℞-only; US: ℞-only; EU: Rx-only

Identifiers
- IUPAC name: N-[1-(3-fluoropropyl)azetidin-3-yl]-6-[(6S,8R)-8-methyl-7-(2,2,2-trifluoroethyl)-3,6,8,9-tetrahydropyrazolo[4,3-f]isoquinolin-6-yl]pyridin-3-amine
- CAS Number: 2222844-89-3
- PubChem CID: 134453496
- IUPHAR/BPS: 12716
- DrugBank: DB19218
- ChemSpider: 103820855
- UNII: JUP57A8EPZ
- KEGG: D12049
- ChEMBL: ChEMBL4650365

Chemical and physical data
- Formula: C_{24}H_{28}F_{4}N_{6}
- Molar mass: 476.524 g·mol^{−1}
- 3D model (JSmol): Interactive image
- SMILES: C[C@@H]1CC2=C(C=CC3=C2C=NN3)[C@H](N1CC(F)(F)F)C4=NC=C(C=C4)NC5CN(C5)CCCF
- InChI: InChI=1S/C24H28F4N6/c1-15-9-19-18(4-6-21-20(19)11-30-32-21)23(34(15)14-24(26,27)28)22-5-3-16(10-29-22)31-17-12-33(13-17)8-2-7-25/h3-6,10-11,15,17,23,31H,2,7-9,12-14H2,1H3,(H,30,32)/t15-,23+/m1/s1; Key:WDHOIABIERMLGY-CMJOXMDJSA-N

Camizestrant, sold under the brand name Etcamah, is an anti-cancer medication used for the treatment of breast cancer. It is an estrogen receptor alpha antagonist and a selective estrogen receptor degrader (SERD).

Camizestrant is an oral selective estrogen receptor degrader (ngSERD) and complete estrogen receptor (ER) antagonist. It blocks the activity of estrogen receptor alpha encoded by both wild-type and mutated ESR1 and induces proteasome-dependent degradation of estrogen receptor alpha, without agonizing estrogen receptor alpha.

Camizestrant was authorized for medical use in the European Union in July 2026, and in the United States in September 2026.

== Medical uses ==
Camizestrant in combination with a CDK4/6 inhibitor (palbociclib, ribociclib, or abemaciclib) is indicated for the treatment of adults with ER-positive, HER2-negative, locally advanced or metastatic breast cancer upon detection of ESR1‑mutation and without disease progression during first-line endocrine therapy in combination with a CDK4/6 inhibitor.

== Side effects ==
The US prescribing information includes a boxed warning for the risk of irregular heart rhythm when camizestrant is taken together with certain other medications, as well as warnings and precautions for an abnormally slow heart rate and potential harm to an unborn baby.

== Society and culture ==
=== Legal status ===
In June 2026, the United Arab Emirates was the first country to approve camizestrant.

In May 2026, the Committee for Medicinal Products for Human Use of the European Medicines Agency adopted a positive opinion, recommending the granting of a marketing authorization for the medicinal product Etcamah, intended for the treatment of ER-positive, HER2-negative locally advanced or metastatic breast cancer in people with ESR1 gene mutations. The applicant for this medicinal product is AstraZeneca AB. Camizestrant was authorized for medical use in the European Union in July 2026.

=== Names ===
Camizestrant is the international nonproprietary name.

Camizestrant is sold under the brand name Etcamah.
