= Acolbifene/prasterone =

Combination formulation of aclobifene and prasterone

Combination of
- Acolbifene: Selective estrogen receptor modulator
- Prasterone: Androgen

Clinical data
- Trade names: Femivia (tentative)
- Other names: Prasterone/acolbifene; Acolbifene/DHEA; DHEA/Acolbifene
- Routes of administration: By mouth

Acolbifene/prasterone (tentative brand name Femivia) is a combination formulation of acolbifene, a selective estrogen receptor modulator, and prasterone (dehydroepiandrosterone; DHEA), an androgen, estrogen, and neurosteroid, which is under development by Endoceutics for the treatment of vasomotor symptoms (hot flashes) in postmenopausal women. The formulation is intended for use by mouth. As of December 2017, it is in phase III clinical trials for this indication.

== See also ==
- List of investigational sex-hormonal agents § Estrogenics
- List of investigational sexual dysfunction drugs
