= Estrogen deprivation therapy =

Hormone therapy

- Other names: Endocrine therapy
- Specialty: Oncology

Estrogen deprivation therapy, also known as endocrine therapy, is a form of hormone therapy that is used in the treatment of breast cancer. Modalities include antiestrogens or estrogen blockers such as selective estrogen receptor modulators (SERMs) such as tamoxifen, selective estrogen receptor degraders such as fulvestrant, and aromatase inhibitors such as anastrozole and ovariectomy.

A breast biopsy is tested for whether the cancer cells contain estrogen or progesterone receptors. A breast cancer that is positive for estrogen receptors is usually also progesterone receptor positive. This type of cancer is called ER/PR positive, which constitutes approximately 80% of all breast cancers. ER positive cancers use estrogen to grow, so administering endocrine therapy to a patient diagnosed with ER/PR positive cancer will depress tumor growth.

Endocrine therapy should not be confused with menopausal hormone therapy or hormone replacement therapy, which is using estrogen and/or progesterone supplements to relieve symptoms of menopause. Estrogen feeds breast cancer cells, so when a woman on hormone replacement therapy (HRT) is diagnosed with ER/PR positive breast cancer, her doctor will ask her to stop the HRT.

Patients that have tumors small enough to take out with surgery will receive endocrine therapy after their surgery, which is part of adjuvant therapy. Large tumors may receive neo-adjuvant therapy via chemotherapy or radiation to shrink the tumor small enough to operate on.

== Types of endocrine therapy medications ==
=== Selective estrogen receptor modulators ===
Selective estrogen receptor modulators (SERMs) act by mimicking estrogen and replacing estrogen on estrogen receptors, blocking estrogen from binding and preventing tumors from using estrogen to grow. They do not interfere with estrogen production. Tamoxifen (Nolvadex) is a commonly used drug for pre-menopausal women diagnosed with ER/PR positive breast cancer. Tamoxifen selectively blocks the effect of estrogen in breast tissue but acts as an estrogen agonist in the uterus and in bone. Research shows that women on tamoxifen for at least 5 years out of surgery are less likely to have recurrent breast cancer, including new breast cancer in the other breast, and death at 15 years.

== See also ==
- Antihormone therapy
- Androgen deprivation therapy
- High-dose estrogen
