= Dimethylcurcumin =

Chemical compound

Clinical data
- Other names: ASC-J9; GO-Y025
- Routes of administration: Topical
- Drug class: Nonsteroidal antiandrogen; Selective androgen receptor degrader

Identifiers
- IUPAC name: (1E,4Z,6E)-1,7-Bis(3,4-dimethoxyphenyl)-5-hydroxyhepta-1,4,6-trien-3-one
- CAS Number: 52328-98-0
- PubChem CID: 6477182
- ChemSpider: 4978553
- UNII: D60XLY608D
- CompTox Dashboard (EPA): DTXSID101316356 DTXSID10200352, DTXSID101316356

Chemical and physical data
- Formula: C_{23}H_{24}O_{6}
- Molar mass: 396.439 g·mol^{−1}
- 3D model (JSmol): Interactive image
- SMILES: COC1=C(C=C(C=C1)/C=C/C(=C/C(=O)/C=C/C2=CC(=C(C=C2)OC)OC)/O)OC
- InChI: InChI=1S/C23H24O6/c1-26-20-11-7-16(13-22(20)28-3)5-9-18(24)15-19(25)10-6-17-8-12-21(27-2)23(14-17)29-4/h5-15,24H,1-4H3/b9-5+,10-6+,18-15-; Key:ZMGUKFHHNQMKJI-CIOHCNBKSA-N

Dimethylcurcumin (development code ASC-J9) is a nonsteroidal antiandrogen and a synthetic curcuminoid.

In vitro, it is an androgen receptor (AR) inhibitor and shows antiandrogenic activity, although its mechanism of action and effects differ from those of conventional antiandrogens; it is not an antagonist of the AR and instead appears to act as a selective degradation enhancer of certain subpopulations of the AR, for instance those present in the prostate gland.

== See also ==
- List of investigational sex-hormonal agents § Androgenics
- Rosolutamide (ASC-JM17, JM17, ALZ-003)
