= Leflutrozole =

Chemical compound

Clinical data
- Other names: BGS-649; CGP-47645
- Routes of administration: By mouth

Identifiers
- IUPAC name: 4-[(4-Cyanophenyl)-fluoro-(1,2,4-triazol-1-yl)methyl]benzonitrile
- CAS Number: 143030-47-1
- PubChem CID: 126735
- ChemSpider: 112569
- UNII: RCX0IE6EJZ
- ChEMBL: ChEMBL225550
- CompTox Dashboard (EPA): DTXSID80162296

Chemical and physical data
- Formula: C_{17}H_{10}FN_{5}
- Molar mass: 303.300 g·mol^{−1}
- 3D model (JSmol): Interactive image
- SMILES: C1=CC(=CC=C1C#N)C(C2=CC=C(C=C2)C#N)(N3C=NC=N3)F
- InChI: InChI=1S/C17H10FN5/c18-17(23-12-21-11-22-23,15-5-1-13(9-19)2-6-15)16-7-3-14(10-20)4-8-16/h1-8,11-12H; Key:PZDLRBUQYWMNBR-UHFFFAOYSA-N

Leflutrozole (developmental code names BGS-649, CGP-47645) is an aromatase inhibitor which is under development by Mereo BioPharma and Novartis for the treatment of hypogonadism in men. It was also under investigation for the treatment of endometriosis, but development for this indication was discontinued. As of December 2017, leflutrozole is in phase II clinical trials for hypogonadism.

== See also ==
- List of investigational sex-hormonal agents § Estrogenics
