= Antiestrogen withdrawal response =

Paradoxical improvement in breast cancer

The antiestrogen withdrawal response is a paradoxical improvement in breast cancer caused by discontinuation of antiestrogen therapy for breast cancer. It has been documented rarely with the selective estrogen receptor modulators (SERMs) tamoxifen and raloxifene. The phenomenon indicates that these agents can somehow result in stimulation of breast cancer tumor progression under certain circumstances. One proposed theory for the mechanism is that the sensitivity of breast cells to estrogens shifts with estrogen deprivation, and upon antiestrogen withdrawal, endogenous estrogen acts in the manner of high-dose estrogen therapy in the breast to inhibit breast cancer growth and induce breast cancer cell death. The antiestrogen withdrawal syndrome is analogous to but less common and well-known than the antiandrogen withdrawal syndrome, a phenomenon in which paradoxical improvement in prostate cancer occurs upon discontinuation of antiandrogen therapy.
