= Giredestrant =

Chemical compound

Clinical data
- Trade names: Wilserdly
- Other names: GDC-9545, RG6171, RO7197597
- ATC code: None

Identifiers
- IUPAC name: 3-[(1R,3R)-1-[2,6-difluoro-4-[[1-(3-fluoropropyl)azetidin-3-yl]amino]phenyl]-3-methyl-1,3,4,9-tetrahydropyrido[3,4-b]indol-2-yl]-2,2-difluoro-propan-1-ol
- CAS Number: 1953133-47-5
- PubChem CID: 121410806
- ChemSpider: 103748880
- UNII: 28P3DU6DB3
- KEGG: D11961
- ChEMBL: ChEMBL4650316

Chemical and physical data
- Formula: C_{27}H_{31}F_{5}N_{4}O
- Molar mass: 522.564 g·mol^{−1}
- 3D model (JSmol): Interactive image
- SMILES: C[C@@H]1CC2=C([C@H](N1CC(CO)(F)F)C3=C(C=C(C=C3F)NC4CN(C4)CCCF)F)NC5=CC=CC=C25
- InChI: InChI=1S/C27H31F5N4O/c1-16-9-20-19-5-2-3-6-23(19)34-25(20)26(36(16)14-27(31,32)15-37)24-21(29)10-17(11-22(24)30)33-18-12-35(13-18)8-4-7-28/h2-3,5-6,10-11,16,18,26,33-34,37H,4,7-9,12-15H2,1H3/t16-,26-/m1/s1; Key:GQCXHIKRWBIQMD-AKJBCIBTSA-N

Giredestrant, sold under the brand name Wilserdly, is an oral selective estrogen receptor degrader (SERD) used for the treatment of estrogen receptor-positive (ER+) breast cancer. It is a potent, nonsteroidal compound that antagonizes estrogen effects by competitively binding to both wild-type and mutant estrogen receptors with nanomolar potency. Giredestrant works by inducing an inactive conformation of the estrogen receptor ligand-binding domain and promoting proteasome-mediated degradation of the receptor protein.
