= Fulvestrant =

Hormonal antineoplastic drug

Clinical data
- Pronunciation: /fʊlˈvɛstrənt/ fuul-VES-trənt
- Trade names: Faslodex, others
- Other names: ICI-182780; ZD-182780; ZD-9238; 7α-[9-[(4,4,5,5,5-Pentafluoropentyl)-sulfinyl]nonyl]estra-1,3,5(10)-triene-3,17β-diol
- AHFS/Drugs.com: Monograph
- MedlinePlus: a607031
- License data: US DailyMed: Fulvestrant
- Pregnancy category: AU: D
- Routes of administration: Intramuscular injection
- Drug class: Antiestrogen
- ATC code: L02BA03 (WHO)

Legal status
- Legal status: AU: S4 (Prescription only); UK: POM (Prescription only); US: ℞-only; EU: Rx-only; In general: ℞ (Prescription only)

Pharmacokinetic data
- Bioavailability: Low
- Protein binding: 99%
- Metabolism: Hydroxylation, conjugation (glucuronidation, sulfation)
- Elimination half-life: IM: 40–50 days

Identifiers
- IUPAC name: (7R,8R,9S,13S,14S,17S)-13-methyl-7-[9-(4,4,5,5,5-pentafluoropentylsulfinyl)nonyl]-6,7,8,9,11,12,14,15,16,17-decahydrocyclopenta[a]phenanthrene-3,17-diol
- CAS Number: 129453-61-8
- PubChem CID: 104741
- IUPHAR/BPS: 1015
- DrugBank: DB00947
- ChemSpider: 94553
- UNII: 22X328QOC4
- KEGG: D01161
- ChEBI: CHEBI:31638
- ChEMBL: ChEMBL1358
- CompTox Dashboard (EPA): DTXSID4022369
- ECHA InfoCard: 100.170.955

Chemical and physical data
- Formula: C_{32}H_{47}F_{5}O_{3}S
- Molar mass: 606.78 g·mol^{−1}
- 3D model (JSmol): Interactive image
- SMILES: C[C@]12CC[C@@H]3c4ccc(O)cc4CC(CCCCCCCCCS(=O)CCCC(F)(F)C(F)(F)F)[C@H]3[C@@H]1CC[C@@H]2O
- InChI: InChI=1S/C32H47F5O3S/c1-30-17-15-26-25-12-11-24(38)21-23(25)20-22(29(26)27(30)13-14-28(30)39)10-7-5-3-2-4-6-8-18-41(40)19-9-16-31(33,34)32(35,36)37/h11-12,21-22,26-29,38-39H,2-10,13-20H2,1H3/t22-,26-,27+,28+,29-,30+,41?/m1/s1; Key:VWUXBMIQPBEWFH-WCCTWKNTSA-N

Fulvestrant, sold under the brand name Faslodex among others, is an antiestrogenic medication used to treat hormone receptor (HR)-positive metastatic breast cancer in postmenopausal women with disease progression as well as HR-positive, HER2-negative advanced breast cancer in combination with abemaciclib or palbociclib in women with disease progression after endocrine therapy. It is given by injection into a muscle.

Fulvestrant is a selective estrogen receptor degrader (SERD) and was first-in-class to be approved. It works by binding to the estrogen receptor and destabilizing it, causing the cell's normal protein degradation processes to destroy it.

Fulvestrant was approved for medical use in the United States in 2002.

== Medical uses ==
=== Breast cancer ===
Fulvestrant is used for the treatment of hormone receptor positive metastatic breast cancer or locally advanced unresectable disease in postmenopausal women; it is given by injection. A 2017 Cochrane review found it is as safe and effective as first line or second line endocrine therapy.

It is also used to treat ER-positive, HER2-negative advanced or metastatic breast cancer in combination with abemaciclib or palbociclib in women with disease progression after first-line endocrine therapy.

Due to the medication's having a chemical structure similar to that of estrogen, it can interact with immunoassays for blood estradiol concentrations and show falsely elevated results. This can improperly lead to discontinuing the treatment.

=== Early puberty ===
Fulvestrant has been used in the treatment of peripheral precocious puberty in girls with McCune–Albright syndrome.

=== Available forms ===
Fulvestrant is provided in a castor oil solution also containing alcohol, benzyl alcohol, and benzyl benzoate. It is supplied at a concentration of 250 mg/5 mL.

== Contraindications ==
Fulvestrant should not be used in women with kidney failure or who are pregnant.

== Side effects ==
Very common (occurring in more than 10% of people) adverse effects include nausea, injection site reactions, weakness, and elevated transaminases. Common (between 1% and 10%) adverse effects include urinary tract infections, hypersensitivity reactions, loss of appetite, headache, blood clots in veins, hot flushes, vomiting, diarrhea, elevated bilirubin, rashes, and back pain. In a large clinical trial, the incidence of venous thromboembolism (VTE) with fulvestrant was 0.9%.

== Pharmacology ==
=== Pharmacodynamics ===
Fulvestrant is an antiestrogen which acts as an antagonist of the estrogen receptor (ER) and additionally as a selective estrogen receptor degrader (SERD). It works by binding to the estrogen receptor and making it more hydrophobic, which makes the receptor unstable and misfold, which in turn leads normal processes inside the cell to degrade it.

In addition to its antiestrogenic activity, fulvestrant is an agonist of the G protein-coupled estrogen receptor (GPER), albeit with relatively low affinity (10–100 nM, relative to 3–6 nM for estradiol).

=== Pharmacokinetics ===
Fulvestrant after an intramuscular injection is slowly absorbed and maximal levels (Cmax) are reached after 5 days on average with a range of 2 to 19 days. The elimination half-life of fulvestrant with intramuscular injection is 40 to 50 days. This is 40 times longer than the half-life of fulvestrant by intravenous injection, indicating that its long half-life with intramuscular injection is due to slow absorption from the injection site. Levels of fulvestrant with 500 mg/month by intramuscular injection (and a single additional 500 mg loading dose on day 15 of therapy) in postmenopausal women with advanced breast cancer were 25.1 ng/mL (25,100 pg/mL) at peak and 28.0 ng/mL (28,000 pg/mL) at trough with a single dose and 28.0 ng/mL (28,000 pg/mL) at peak and 12.2 ng/mL (12,200 pg/mL) at trough after multiple doses at steady state.

Fulvestrant does not cross the blood–brain barrier in animals and may not in humans as well. Accordingly, no effects of fulvestrant on brain function have been observed in preclinical or clinical research. Fulvestrant is highly (99%) bound to plasma proteins. It is bound to very low density lipoprotein, low density lipoprotein, and high density lipoprotein, but not to sex hormone-binding globulin.

Fulvestrant appears to be metabolized along similar pathways as endogenous steroids; CYP3A4 may be involved, but non-cytochrome P450 routes appear to be more important. It does not inhibit any cytochrome P450 enzymes. Elimination is almost all via feces.

Fulvestrant can form colloidal aggregates at certain concentration ranges and this can limit its activity as well as produce bell-shaped concentration–response curves.

== Chemistry ==
Fulvestrant, also known as 7α-[9-[(4,4,5,5,5-pentafluoropentyl)sulfinyl]nonyl]estradiol, is a synthetic estrane steroid and a derivative of estradiol. An alkyl-sulfinyl moiety was added to the endogenous estrogen receptor ligand.

It was discovered through rational drug design, but was selected for further development via phenotypic screening.

=== Synthesis ===
Due to problems with the original fulvestrant synthesis starting from nandrolone, an alternative method of synthesis was disclosed: Starting materials:

Treatment of 6-Ketoestradiol [571-92-6] (1) with acetic anhydride gives 6-Oxoestradiol diacetate [3434-45-5] (2). Reaction of 9-[(4,4,5,5,5-Pentafluoropentyl)sulfanyl]nonan-1-ol [511545-94-1] (3) with mesyl chloride followed by displacement with potassium iodide gives 1-Iodo-9-[(4,4,5,5,5-pentafluoropentyl)thio]nonane [862700-63-8] (4). Reaction of 2 with potassium tert-butoxide followed by addition of 4 gives PC71724892 (5). Catalytic hydrogenation reduces the benzoyl ketone to give (6). Saponification of the acetyl protecting groups gives [153004-31-0] (7). Lastly, oxidation of the sulfanyl group with sodium periodate gives the sulfoxide, completing the synthesis of fulvestrant (8).

Alternative syntheses: etc.

== History ==
Fulvestrant was the first selective estrogen receptor degrader to be approved. It was approved in the United States in 2002 and in the European Union in 2004.

== Society and culture ==
=== NICE evaluation ===
The U.K. National Institute for Health and Clinical Excellence (NICE) said in 2011 that it found no evidence Faslodex was significantly better than existing treatments, so its widespread use would not be a good use of resources for the country's National Health Service. The first month's treatment of Faslodex, which starts with a loading dose, costs £1,044.82 ($1,666), and subsequent treatments cost £522.41 a month. In the 12 months ending June 2015, the UK price (excluding VAT) of a month's supply of anastrozole (Arimidex), which is off patent, cost 89 pence/day, and letrozole (Femara) cost £1.40/day.

=== Patent extension ===
The original patent for Faslodex expired in October 2004. Drugs subject to pre-marketing regulatory review are eligible for patent extension, and for this reason AstraZeneca got an extension of the patent to December 2011. AstraZeneca has filed later patents. A generic version of Faslodex has been approved by the FDA. However, this does not mean that the product will necessarily be commercially available - possibly because of drug patents and/or drug exclusivity. A later patent for Faslodex expires in January 2021. Atossa Genetics has a patent for the administration of fulvestrant into the breast via a microcatheter invented by Susan Love.

== Research ==
Fulvestrant was studied in endometrial cancer but results were not promising and as of 2016 development for this use was abandoned.

Because fulvestrant cannot be given orally, efforts have been made to develop SERD drugs that can be taken by mouth, including brilanestrant and elacestrant. The clinical success of fulvestrant also led to efforts to discover and develop a parallel drug class of selective androgen receptor degraders (SARDs).

ZB716, or fulvestrant-3-boronic acid, is an oral prodrug of fulvestrant which is under development.
