= Elacestrant =

Chemical compound

Clinical data
- Pronunciation: /ˌɛləˈsɛstrənt/ EL-ə-SES-trənt
- Trade names: Orserdu
- Other names: RAD-1901; ER-306323
- License data: US DailyMed: Elacestrant
- Routes of administration: By mouth
- ATC code: L02BA04 (WHO)

Legal status
- Legal status: US: ℞-only; EU: Rx-only

Pharmacokinetic data
- Bioavailability: ~10%
- Protein binding: >99%
- Metabolism: Liver (major: CYP3A4, minor: CYP2A6, CYP2C9)
- Elimination half-life: 30–50 hours
- Excretion: Feces (82%), urine (7.5%)

Identifiers
- IUPAC name: (6R)-6-{2-[Ethyl({4-[2-(ethylamino)ethyl]phenyl}methyl)amino]-4-methoxyphenyl}-5,6,7,8-tetrahydronaphthalen-2-ol
- CAS Number: 722533-56-4
- PubChem CID: 23642301
- DrugBank: DB06374
- ChemSpider: 57583807
- UNII: FM6A2627A8
- KEGG: D11671
- ChEMBL: ChEMBL4297509
- PDB ligand: I0V (PDBe, RCSB PDB)
- CompTox Dashboard (EPA): DTXSID901045846
- ECHA InfoCard: 100.312.890

Chemical and physical data
- Formula: C_{30}H_{38}N_{2}O_{2}
- Molar mass: 458.646 g·mol^{−1}
- 3D model (JSmol): Interactive image
- SMILES: CCNCCC1=CC=C(C=C1)CN(CC)C2=C(C=CC(=C2)OC)C3CCC4=C(C3)C=CC(=C4)O
- InChI: InChI=1S/C30H38N2O2/c1-4-31-17-16-22-6-8-23(9-7-22)21-32(5-2)30-20-28(34-3)14-15-29(30)26-11-10-25-19-27(33)13-12-24(25)18-26/h6-9,12-15,19-20,26,31,33H,4-5,10-11,16-18,21H2,1-3H3/t26-/m1/s1; Key:SIFNOOUKXBRGGB-AREMUKBSSA-N

Elacestrant, sold under the brand name Orserdu, is a selective estrogen receptor degrader (SERD) used in the treatment of breast cancer. It is taken by mouth.

Elacestrant is an antiestrogen that acts as an antagonist of estrogen receptors, which are the biological targets of endogenous estrogens like estradiol. The most common side effects of elacestrant include body pain, nausea and vomiting, increased serum lipids, elevated liver enzymes, fatigue, decreased hemoglobin, raised creatinine, decreased appetite, diarrhea, headache, constipation, abdominal pain, and hot flashes.

Elacestrant was approved for medical use in the United States in January 2023, and in the European Union in September 2023.

== Medical uses ==
Elacestrant is indicated for the treatment of postmenopausal women or adult men with estrogen receptor (ER)-positive, human epidermal growth factor receptor 2 (HER2)-negative, ESR1-mutated, advanced or metastatic breast cancer with disease progression following at least one other line of endocrine therapy.

== Pharmacology ==
=== Pharmacodynamics ===
Elacestrant is an antiestrogen that acts as an antagonist of estrogen receptors, specifically targeting the estrogen receptor alpha (ERα), which is the biological target of endogenous estrogens like estradiol. Additionally, elacestrant is a selective estrogen receptor degrader (SERD), meaning it induces the degradation of ERα.

=== Pharmacokinetics ===
Elacestrant has an oral bioavailability of approximately 10%. Its plasma protein binding exceeds 99% and remains independent of concentration. Elacestrant is metabolized in the liver, primarily by the cytochrome P450 enzyme CYP3A4 and to a lesser extent by CYP2A6 and CYP2C9. The elimination half-life of elacestrant is 30 to 50 hours. It is excreted primarily in feces (82%) and to a lesser extent in urine (7.5%).

== History ==
The efficacy of elacestrant was evaluated in the EMERALD trial, which was a randomized, open-label, active-controlled, multicenter study involving 478 postmenopausal women and men with ER-positive, HER2-negative advanced or metastatic breast cancer. Among them, 228 participants had ESR1 mutations. Eligible participants had experienced disease progression on one or two prior lines of endocrine therapy, including one line with a CDK4/6 inhibitor, and could have received up to one prior line of chemotherapy in the advanced or metastatic setting.

Participants were randomly assigned in a 1:1 ratio to receive either elacestrant 345 mg orally once daily or investigator's choice of endocrine therapy. The choices for the control arm included fulvestrant, or an aromatase inhibitor. Randomization was stratified based on whether the ESR1 mutation was detected or not, prior treatment with fulvestrant, and presence of visceral metastasis.

The FDA granted the application for elacestrant priority review and fast track designations.

== Research ==
It is a nonsteroidal combined selective estrogen receptor modulator (SERM) and selective estrogen receptor degrader (SERD) (described as a "SERM/SERD hybrid (SSH)") that was discovered by Eisai and is under development by Radius Health and Takeda for the treatment estrogen receptor (ER)-positive advanced breast cancer. Elacestrant has dose-dependent, tissue-selective estrogenic and antiestrogenic activities, with biphasic weak partial agonist activity at the ER at low doses and antagonist activity at higher doses. It shows agonistic activity on bone and antagonistic activity on breast and uterine tissues. Unlike the SERD fulvestrant, elacestrant is able to readily cross the blood-brain-barrier into the central nervous system, where it can target breast cancer metastases in the brain, and is orally bioavailable and does not require intramuscular injection.
