= Rintodestrant =

Chemical compound

Clinical data
- Other names: G1T48

Identifiers
- IUPAC name: (E)-3-[4-[2-(4-fluoro-2,6-dimethyl-benzoyl)-6-hydroxy-benzothiophen-3-yl]oxyphenyl]prop-2-enoic acid
- CAS Number: 2088518-51-6
- PubChem CID: 129205616
- ChemSpider: 76743881
- UNII: W3Y784Y0ES
- KEGG: D11736
- ChEMBL: ChEMBL4059888

Chemical and physical data
- Formula: C_{26}H_{19}FO_{5}S
- Molar mass: 462.49 g·mol^{−1}
- 3D model (JSmol): Interactive image
- SMILES: CC1=CC(=CC(=C1C(=O)C2=C(C3=C(S2)C=C(C=C3)O)OC4=CC=C(C=C4)/C=C/C(=O)O)C)F
- InChI: InChI=InChI=1S/C26H19FO5S/c1-14-11-17(27)12-15(2)23(14)24(31)26-25(20-9-6-18(28)13-21(20)33-26)32-19-7-3-16(4-8-19)5-10-22(29)30/h3-13,28H,1-2H3,(H,29,30)/b10-5+; Key:KOAITBOFZOEDOC-BJMVGYQFSA-N

Rintodestrant (G1T48) is an orally bioavailable selective estrogen receptor degrader (SERD) discovered in Greg Thatcher's lab at UIC and developed by G1 Therapeutics for the treatment of estrogen receptor-positive (ER+) breast cancer. Structurally inspired by the 6-OH-benzothiophene scaffold used in arzoxifene and raloxifene, rintodestrant selectively binds to the estrogen receptor and inhibits ER signaling, demonstrating efficacy in endocrine-resistant tumors.

A phase I clinical trial evaluated rintodestrant as monotherapy and in combination with the CDK4/6 inhibitor palbociclib in patients with ER+/HER2- advanced breast cancer.
