= Taragarestrant =

Chemical compound

Clinical data
- Other names: D-0502

Identifiers
- IUPAC name: (E)-3-[3,5-dichloro-4-[(1R,3R)-2-(2-fluoro-2-methyl-propyl)-3-methyl-1,3,4,9-tetrahydropyrido[3,4-b]indol-1-yl]phenyl]prop-2-enoic acid
- CAS Number: 2118899-51-5
- PubChem CID: 130330722
- ChemSpider: 127404554
- UNII: KD4HIM135V
- ChEMBL: ChEMBL5087025

Chemical and physical data
- Formula: C_{25}H_{25}Cl_{2}FN_{2}O_{2}
- Molar mass: 475.39 g·mol^{−1}
- 3D model (JSmol): Interactive image
- SMILES: C[C@@H]1CC2=C([C@H](N1CC(C)(C)F)C3=C(C=C(C=C3Cl)/C=C/C(=O)O)Cl)NC4=CC=CC=C24
- InChI: InChI=InChI=1S/C25H25Cl2FN2O2/c1-14-10-17-16-6-4-5-7-20(16)29-23(17)24(30(14)13-25(2,3)28)22-18(26)11-15(12-19(22)27)8-9-21(31)32/h4-9,11-12,14,24,29H,10,13H2,1-3H3,(H,31,32)/b9-8+/t14-,24-/m1/s1; Key:PSJRZBBUWGIUPM-BBNFHIFMSA-N

Taragarestrant is an orally bioavailable selective estrogen receptor degrader (SERD) developed by Inventis Bio for the treatment of estrogen receptor-positive (ER+) breast cancer. Structurally similar to AZD9496, taragarestrant has demonstrated potent efficacy across multiple breast cancer cell lines expressing ER and related xenograft models. In preclinical studies, taragarestrant exhibited anti-tumor activity, warranting further clinical investigation.

A phase I study (NCT03471663) evaluated taragarestrant in females with ER+/HER2- advanced or metastatic breast cancer, both as monotherapy and in combination with the CDK4/6 inhibitor palbociclib. A phase III clinical trial has been initiated in China in patients with ER+/HER2- advanced or metastatic breast cancer.
