= Amcenestrant =

Chemical compound

Identifiers
- IUPAC name: 6-(2,4-dichlorophenyl)-5-[4-[(3S)-1-(3-fluoropropyl)pyrrolidin-3-yl]oxyphenyl]-8,9-dihydro-7H-benzo[7]annulene-2-carboxylic acid
- CAS Number: 2114339-57-8
- PubChem CID: 130232326
- IUPHAR/BPS: 10566
- DrugBank: DB17864
- ChemSpider: 76117729
- UNII: TBF1NHY02O
- KEGG: D12145
- ChEMBL: ChEMBL4475463
- PDB ligand: L5B (PDBe, RCSB PDB)

Chemical and physical data
- Formula: C_{31}H_{30}Cl_{2}FNO_{3}
- Molar mass: 554.48 g·mol^{−1}
- 3D model (JSmol): Interactive image
- SMILES: C1CC2=C(C=CC(=C2)C(=O)O)C(=C(C1)C3=C(C=C(C=C3)Cl)Cl)C4=CC=C(C=C4)O[C@H]5CCN(C5)CCCF
- InChI: InChI=InChI=1S/C31H30Cl2FNO3/c32-23-8-12-27(29(33)18-23)28-4-1-3-21-17-22(31(36)37)7-11-26(21)30(28)20-5-9-24(10-6-20)38-25-13-16-35(19-25)15-2-14-34/h5-12,17-18,25H,1-4,13-16,19H2,(H,36,37)/t25-/m0/s1; Key:KISZAGQTIXIVAR-VWLOTQADSA-N

Amcenestrant is a novel oral selective estrogen receptor degrader (SERD) that is being evaluated for the treatment of estrogen receptor-positive (ER+) breast cancer.

Phase III trial for breast cancer in Japan had started, but this trial has been discontinued.
