= Selective estrogen receptor degrader =

Class of drugs

A selective estrogen receptor degrader or downregulator (SERD) is a type of drug that selectively binds to the estrogen receptor (ER) and induces its degradation, and thus causes its downregulation. SERDs are used in the treatment of estrogen receptor-positive breast cancer, particularly in cases where tumors have developed resistance to other forms of endocrine therapy, such as selective estrogen receptor modulators (SERMs) or aromatase inhibitors.

The mechanism of action of SERDs involves binding to the estrogen receptor, leading to a conformational change that facilitates recruitment of cellular machinery to degrade the receptor protein. By promoting degradation of the estrogen receptor, SERDs effectively inhibit estrogen signaling within cancer cells, thereby suppressing tumor growth.

A common SERD used in clinical practice is fulvestrant. Fulvestrant is administered as an intramuscular injection and is indicated for the treatment of advanced breast cancer in postmenopausal women whose cancer has progressed following anti-estrogen therapy.

As of 2026 the marketed SERDs are fulvestrant (brand name Faslodex),, elacestrant (brand name Orserdu), imlunestrant (Inluriyo), and vepdegestrant (Veppanu). The clinical success of fulvestrant led to efforts to discover and develop a parallel drug class of selective androgen receptor degraders (SARDs).

== Investigational ==
Fulvestrant requires intramuscular injections once every two weeks. In response, pharmaceutical companies are currently developing oral SERDs. Among products in development are:

Monofunction (ER ligand) hydrophobic tag degradation:

List of Selective Estrogen Receptor Degraders (SERDs)
Modality	INN	Research Code	Sponsor	Comment
hydrophobic tag	Amcenestrant	SAR 439859	Sanofi	
"	Brilanestrant		Genentech	
"	Camizestrant	AZD9833	AstraZeneca	
"	Elacestrant		Radius	
"	Giredestrant		Roche	
"	Imlunestrant	LY3484356	Eli Lilly	
"	Palazestrant	OP-1250	Olema Pharmaceuticals	
"		H3B-6545	Eisai Co Ltd	SERCA
"		ZB716	EnhancedBio/Zenopharm	Fulvestrant boronic acid
carboxylate	Bexirestrant		Menarini	
"	Etacstil	GW-5638	Bristol Myers-Squibb	combined SERM and SERD
"	Rintodestrant	G1T48	G1 Therapeutics	
"	Taragarestrant	D-0502	Inventisbio	
"		LSZ102	Novartis	
"		ZN-c5	Zentalis	
?		SHR9549	Jiangsu Hengrui	
PROTAC	Vepdegestrant	ARV-471	Arvinas	
"		AC 699	Accutar Biotechnology	

The oral SERDs target ER-positive/HER2-negative breast cancer and are tested as monotherapy and in combination with other drugs such as the CDK inhibitor palbociclib (Ibrance).

  - AZD 9496
  - GDC 0927
  - H3B 5942
  - GLL 398

== See also ==
- Aromatase inhibitor
- Estrogen deprivation therapy
