= Abemaciclib =

Anti-breast cancer medication

Clinical data
- Pronunciation: /əˌbɛməˈsaɪklɪb/ ə-BEM-ə-SYE-klib
- Trade names: Verzenio, Verzenios, Ramiven, others
- Other names: LY2835219
- AHFS/Drugs.com: Monograph
- License data: US DailyMed: Abemaciclib
- Routes of administration: By mouth
- ATC code: L01EF03 (WHO)

Legal status
- Legal status: AU: S4 (Prescription only); CA: ℞-only / Schedule D; US: ℞-only; EU: Rx-only

Pharmacokinetic data
- Bioavailability: 45%
- Protein binding: 96.3%
- Elimination half-life: 18.3 hrs
- Excretion: 81% via feces, 3% via urine

Identifiers
- IUPAC name: N-[5-[(4-Ethyl-1-piperazinyl)methyl]-2-pyridinyl]-5-fluoro-4-[4-fluoro-2-methyl-1-(1-methylethyl)-1H-benzimidazol-6-yl]-2-pyrimidinamine
- CAS Number: 1231929-97-7
- PubChem CID: 46220502
- DrugBank: DB12001
- ChemSpider: 29340700
- UNII: 60UAB198HK
- KEGG: D10688
- ChEMBL: ChEMBL3301610
- PDB ligand: 6ZV (PDBe, RCSB PDB)
- CompTox Dashboard (EPA): DTXSID20673119
- ECHA InfoCard: 100.233.787

Chemical and physical data
- Formula: C_{27}H_{32}F_{2}N_{8}
- Molar mass: 506.606 g·mol^{−1}
- 3D model (JSmol): Interactive image
- SMILES: CCN1CCN(CC1)Cc2ccc(nc2)Nc3ncc(c(n3)c4cc5c(c(c4)F)nc(n5C(C)C)C)F
- InChI: InChI=1S/C27H32F2N8/c1-5-35-8-10-36(11-9-35)16-19-6-7-24(30-14-19)33-27-31-15-22(29)25(34-27)20-12-21(28)26-23(13-20)37(17(2)3)18(4)32-26/h6-7,12-15,17H,5,8-11,16H2,1-4H3,(H,30,31,33,34); Key:UZWDCWONPYILKI-UHFFFAOYSA-N

Abemaciclib, sold under the brand name Verzenio among others, is a medication for the treatment of advanced or metastatic breast cancers. It was developed by Eli Lilly and it acts as a CDK inhibitor selective for CDK4 and CDK6.

It was designated as a breakthrough therapy for breast cancer by the US Food and Drug Administration (FDA) in October 2015.

In September 2017, it was approved for use in the United States by the FDA for the treatment of certain breast cancers.

== Medical uses ==
Since September 2017, abemaciclib has been approved in the US for "adults who have hormone receptor (HR)-positive, human epidermal growth factor receptor 2 (HER2)-negative advanced or metastatic breast cancer that has progressed after taking therapy that alters a patient's hormones".

In studies that compared fulvestrant plus abemaciclib to fulvestrant plus placebo in breast cancer patients, progression-free survival under abemaciclib therapy was 16.4 months on average, as compared to 9.3 months under the placebo arm.

== Side effects ==
Side effects that occurred in 20% or more of patients in studies were diarrhea, nausea and vomiting, leukopenia (low white blood cell count) including neutropenia, anemia (low red blood cell count), thrombocytopenia (low platelet count), stomach pain, infections, fatigue, decreased appetite, and headache.

== Interactions ==
As abemaciclib is mainly metabolized by the liver enzyme CYP3A4, inhibitors of this enzyme (such as ketoconazole) are expected to increase its blood plasma concentrations. Conversely, CYP3A4 inducers lower plasma concentrations of abemaciclib, as has been shown in a study with rifampicin.

== Pharmacology ==
=== Mechanism of action ===
Like the related drugs palbociclib and ribociclib, abemaciclib inhibits the enzymes cyclin-dependent kinase 4 (CDK4) and cyclin-dependent kinase 6 (CDK6). These enzymes are responsible for phosphorylating and thus deactivating the retinoblastoma protein, which plays a role in cell cycle progression from the G1 (first gap) to the S (synthesis) phase. Blocking this pathway prevents cells from progressing to the S phase, thereby inducing apoptosis (cell death). In vitro analysis using cancer cell lines, it is reported that abemaciclib induces non-apoptotic cell death characterized by formation of cytoplasmic vacuoles derived from lysosomes. This result suggests that there may be a mechanism of action other than inhibition of a cyclin-dependent kinase.

=== Pharmacokinetics ===
N-desethylabemaciclib (M2), the main metabolite

After oral intake, absolute bioavailability is 45%. Highest blood plasma concentrations are reached after 8 hours on average (range: 4.1–24.0 hours). When in the circulation, 96.3% of abemaciclib is bound to plasma proteins. The substance is mainly metabolized by the liver enzyme CYP3A4 to N-desethylabemaciclib (M2), and to a lesser extent to hydroxy derivatives (M18, M20) and another oxidative metabolite (M1). These metabolites have high plasma protein binding rates similar to the parent substance.

Abemaciclib is excreted mainly via the feces (81%) and to a small extent via the urine (3%). Its elimination half-life is 18.3 hours on average.

== Clinical trials ==
Successful trials against pre-treated metastatic breast cancer were announced for Phase I in May 2014, Phase II in December 2014, and Phase III in February 2017. Abemaciclib was approved by the FDA in September 2017 either in combination with fulvestrant or as a monotherapy for women with HR+, HER2- advanced or metastatic breast cancer that had progressed while receiving endocrine therapy. Abemaciclib was approved for the adjuvant treatment of HR+, HER2-, node-positive adjuvant breast cancer at high risk of recurrence in March 2023.

As of 2023, abemaciclib was involved in two Phase III clinical trials:

- The SARC041 study compares abemaciclib versus placebo in patients with advanced dedifferentiated liposarcoma.
- The CYCLONE 3 study compares abemaciclib versus placebo in combination with abiraterone and prednisone in patients with high-risk, metastatic, hormone-sensitive prostate cancer.

Abemaciclib is in Phase I and II clinical trials for head and neck squamous cell carcinoma, biliary tract carcinoma, brain tumors, neurofibromatosis, Kaposi sarcoma, metastatic renal cell carcinoma, and mantle cell lymphoma.

== Chemistry ==
Abemaciclib may be synthesized in a four step manner using a Suzuki coupling, followed by a Buchwald–Hartwig amination with the final step being a reductive amination using the Leuckart reaction.
