= Antiestrogen =

Class of drugs

- Drug class
- Fulvestrant, a steroidal antiestrogen and a drug used in the treatment of breast cancer.

Class identifiers
- Synonyms: Estrogen antagonists; Estrogen blockers; Estradiol antagonists
- Use: Breast cancer; Infertility; Male hypogonadism; Gynecomastia; transgender men
- ATC code: L02BA
- Biological target: Estrogen receptor
- Chemical class: Steroidal; Nonsteroidal (triphenylethylene, others)

External links
- MeSH: D020847

Legal status

Antiestrogens, also known as estrogen antagonists or estrogen blockers, are a class of drugs which prevent estrogens like estradiol from mediating their biological effects in the body. They act by blocking the estrogen receptor (ER) and/or inhibiting or suppressing estrogen production. Antiestrogens are one of three types of sex hormone antagonists, the others being antiandrogens and antiprogestogens. Antiestrogens are commonly used to stop estrogens from binding to the estrogen receptors, leading to a decrease of the effects of estrogens. Decreased levels of estrogen can lead to complications in sexual development.

== Types and examples ==
Antiestrogens include selective estrogen receptor modulators (SERMs) like tamoxifen, clomifene, and raloxifene, the ER silent antagonist and selective estrogen receptor degrader (SERD) fulvestrant, aromatase inhibitors (AIs) like anastrozole, and antigonadotropins including androgens/anabolic steroids, progestogens, and GnRH analogues.

Estrogen receptors (ER) like ERα and ERβ include activation function 1 (AF1) domain and activation function 2 (AF2) domain in which SERMS act as antagonists for the AF2 domain, while "pure" antiestrogens like ICI 182,780 and ICI 164,384 are antagonists for the AF1 and AF2 domains.

Although aromatase inhibitors and antigonadotropins can be considered antiestrogens by some definitions, they are often treated as distinct classes. Aromatase inhibitors and antigonadotropins reduce the production of estrogen, while the term "antiestrogen" is often reserved for agents reducing the response to estrogen.

== Medical uses ==
Antiestrogens are used for:

- Estrogen deprivation therapy in the treatment of ER-positive breast cancer
- Ovulation induction in infertility due to anovulation
- Male hypogonadism
- Gynecomastia (breast development in men)
- A component of hormone replacement therapy for transgender men

== Side effects ==
In women, the side effects of antiestrogens include hot flashes, osteoporosis, breast atrophy, vaginal dryness, and vaginal atrophy. In addition, they may cause depression and reduced libido.

== Pharmacology ==
Antiestrogens act as antagonists of the estrogen receptors, ERα and ERβ.

Affinities of estrogen receptor ligands for the ERα and ERβ
Ligand	Other names	Relative binding affinities (RBA, %)^{a}		Absolute binding affinities (K_{i}, nM)^{a}		Action
Ligand	Other names	ERα	ERβ	ERα	ERβ	Action
Estradiol	E2; 17β-Estradiol	100	100	0.115 (0.04–0.24)	0.15 (0.10–2.08)	Estrogen
Estrone	E1; 17-Ketoestradiol	16.39 (0.7–60)	6.5 (1.36–52)	0.445 (0.3–1.01)	1.75 (0.35–9.24)	Estrogen
Estriol	E3; 16α-OH-17β-E2	12.65 (4.03–56)	26 (14.0–44.6)	0.45 (0.35–1.4)	0.7 (0.63–0.7)	Estrogen
Estetrol	E4; 15α,16α-Di-OH-17β-E2	4.0	3.0	4.9	19	Estrogen
Alfatradiol	17α-Estradiol	20.5 (7–80.1)	8.195 (2–42)	0.2–0.52	0.43–1.2	Metabolite
16-Epiestriol	16β-Hydroxy-17β-estradiol	7.795 (4.94–63)	50	?	?	Metabolite
17-Epiestriol	16α-Hydroxy-17α-estradiol	55.45 (29–103)	79–80	?	?	Metabolite
16,17-Epiestriol	16β-Hydroxy-17α-estradiol	1.0	13	?	?	Metabolite
2-Hydroxyestradiol	2-OH-E2	22 (7–81)	11–35	2.5	1.3	Metabolite
2-Methoxyestradiol	2-MeO-E2	0.0027–2.0	1.0	?	?	Metabolite
4-Hydroxyestradiol	4-OH-E2	13 (8–70)	7–56	1.0	1.9	Metabolite
4-Methoxyestradiol	4-MeO-E2	2.0	1.0	?	?	Metabolite
2-Hydroxyestrone	2-OH-E1	2.0–4.0	0.2–0.4	?	?	Metabolite
2-Methoxyestrone	2-MeO-E1	<0.001–<1	<1	?	?	Metabolite
4-Hydroxyestrone	4-OH-E1	1.0–2.0	1.0	?	?	Metabolite
4-Methoxyestrone	4-MeO-E1	<1	<1	?	?	Metabolite
16α-Hydroxyestrone	16α-OH-E1; 17-Ketoestriol	2.0–6.5	35	?	?	Metabolite
2-Hydroxyestriol	2-OH-E3	2.0	1.0	?	?	Metabolite
4-Methoxyestriol	4-MeO-E3	1.0	1.0	?	?	Metabolite
Estradiol sulfate	E2S; Estradiol 3-sulfate	<1	<1	?	?	Metabolite
Estradiol disulfate	Estradiol 3,17β-disulfate	0.0004	?	?	?	Metabolite
Estradiol 3-glucuronide	E2-3G	0.0079	?	?	?	Metabolite
Estradiol 17β-glucuronide	E2-17G	0.0015	?	?	?	Metabolite
Estradiol 3-gluc. 17β-sulfate	E2-3G-17S	0.0001	?	?	?	Metabolite
Estrone sulfate	E1S; Estrone 3-sulfate	<1	<1	>10	>10	Metabolite
Estradiol benzoate	EB; Estradiol 3-benzoate	10	?	?	?	Estrogen
Estradiol 17β-benzoate	E2-17B	11.3	32.6	?	?	Estrogen
Estrone methyl ether	Estrone 3-methyl ether	0.145	?	?	?	Estrogen
ent-Estradiol	1-Estradiol	1.31–12.34	9.44–80.07	?	?	Estrogen
Equilin	7-Dehydroestrone	13 (4.0–28.9)	13.0–49	0.79	0.36	Estrogen
Equilenin	6,8-Didehydroestrone	2.0–15	7.0–20	0.64	0.62	Estrogen
17β-Dihydroequilin	7-Dehydro-17β-estradiol	7.9–113	7.9–108	0.09	0.17	Estrogen
17α-Dihydroequilin	7-Dehydro-17α-estradiol	18.6 (18–41)	14–32	0.24	0.57	Estrogen
17β-Dihydroequilenin	6,8-Didehydro-17β-estradiol	35–68	90–100	0.15	0.20	Estrogen
17α-Dihydroequilenin	6,8-Didehydro-17α-estradiol	20	49	0.50	0.37	Estrogen
Δ^{8}-Estradiol	8,9-Dehydro-17β-estradiol	68	72	0.15	0.25	Estrogen
Δ^{8}-Estrone	8,9-Dehydroestrone	19	32	0.52	0.57	Estrogen
Ethinylestradiol	EE; 17α-Ethynyl-17β-E2	120.9 (68.8–480)	44.4 (2.0–144)	0.02–0.05	0.29–0.81	Estrogen
Mestranol	EE 3-methyl ether	?	2.5	?	?	Estrogen
Moxestrol	RU-2858; 11β-Methoxy-EE	35–43	5–20	0.5	2.6	Estrogen
Methylestradiol	17α-Methyl-17β-estradiol	70	44	?	?	Estrogen
Diethylstilbestrol	DES; Stilbestrol	129.5 (89.1–468)	219.63 (61.2–295)	0.04	0.05	Estrogen
Hexestrol	Dihydrodiethylstilbestrol	153.6 (31–302)	60–234	0.06	0.06	Estrogen
Dienestrol	Dehydrostilbestrol	37 (20.4–223)	56–404	0.05	0.03	Estrogen
Benzestrol (B2)	–	114	?	?	?	Estrogen
Chlorotrianisene	TACE	1.74	?	15.30	?	Estrogen
Triphenylethylene	TPE	0.074	?	?	?	Estrogen
Triphenylbromoethylene	TPBE	2.69	?	?	?	Estrogen
Tamoxifen	ICI-46,474	3 (0.1–47)	3.33 (0.28–6)	3.4–9.69	2.5	SERM
Afimoxifene	4-Hydroxytamoxifen; 4-OHT	100.1 (1.7–257)	10 (0.98–339)	2.3 (0.1–3.61)	0.04–4.8	SERM
Toremifene	4-Chlorotamoxifen; 4-CT	?	?	7.14–20.3	15.4	SERM
Clomifene	MRL-41	25 (19.2–37.2)	12	0.9	1.2	SERM
Cyclofenil	F-6066; Sexovid	151–152	243	?	?	SERM
Nafoxidine	U-11,000A	30.9–44	16	0.3	0.8	SERM
Raloxifene	–	41.2 (7.8–69)	5.34 (0.54–16)	0.188–0.52	20.2	SERM
Arzoxifene	LY-353,381	?	?	0.179	?	SERM
Lasofoxifene	CP-336,156	10.2–166	19.0	0.229	?	SERM
Ormeloxifene	Centchroman	?	?	0.313	?	SERM
Levormeloxifene	6720-CDRI; NNC-460,020	1.55	1.88	?	?	SERM
Ospemifene	Deaminohydroxytoremifene	0.82–2.63	0.59–1.22	?	?	SERM
Bazedoxifene	–	?	?	0.053	?	SERM
Etacstil	GW-5638	4.30	11.5	?	?	SERM
ICI-164,384	–	63.5 (3.70–97.7)	166	0.2	0.08	Antiestrogen
Fulvestrant	ICI-182,780	43.5 (9.4–325)	21.65 (2.05–40.5)	0.42	1.3	Antiestrogen
Propylpyrazoletriol	PPT	49 (10.0–89.1)	0.12	0.40	92.8	ERα agonist
16α-LE2	16α-Lactone-17β-estradiol	14.6–57	0.089	0.27	131	ERα agonist
16α-Iodo-E2	16α-Iodo-17β-estradiol	30.2	2.30	?	?	ERα agonist
Methylpiperidinopyrazole	MPP	11	0.05	?	?	ERα antagonist
Diarylpropionitrile	DPN	0.12–0.25	6.6–18	32.4	1.7	ERβ agonist
8β-VE2	8β-Vinyl-17β-estradiol	0.35	22.0–83	12.9	0.50	ERβ agonist
Prinaberel	ERB-041; WAY-202,041	0.27	67–72	?	?	ERβ agonist
ERB-196	WAY-202,196	?	180	?	?	ERβ agonist
Erteberel	SERBA-1; LY-500,307	?	?	2.68	0.19	ERβ agonist
SERBA-2	–	?	?	14.5	1.54	ERβ agonist
Coumestrol	–	9.225 (0.0117–94)	64.125 (0.41–185)	0.14–80.0	0.07–27.0	Xenoestrogen
Genistein	–	0.445 (0.0012–16)	33.42 (0.86–87)	2.6–126	0.3–12.8	Xenoestrogen
Equol	–	0.2–0.287	0.85 (0.10–2.85)	?	?	Xenoestrogen
Daidzein	–	0.07 (0.0018–9.3)	0.7865 (0.04–17.1)	2.0	85.3	Xenoestrogen
Biochanin A	–	0.04 (0.022–0.15)	0.6225 (0.010–1.2)	174	8.9	Xenoestrogen
Kaempferol	–	0.07 (0.029–0.10)	2.2 (0.002–3.00)	?	?	Xenoestrogen
Naringenin	–	0.0054 (<0.001–0.01)	0.15 (0.11–0.33)	?	?	Xenoestrogen
8-Prenylnaringenin	8-PN	4.4	?	?	?	Xenoestrogen
Quercetin	–	<0.001–0.01	0.002–0.040	?	?	Xenoestrogen
Ipriflavone	–	<0.01	<0.01	?	?	Xenoestrogen
Miroestrol	–	0.39	?	?	?	Xenoestrogen
Deoxymiroestrol	–	2.0	?	?	?	Xenoestrogen
β-Sitosterol	–	<0.001–0.0875	<0.001–0.016	?	?	Xenoestrogen
Resveratrol	–	<0.001–0.0032	?	?	?	Xenoestrogen
α-Zearalenol	–	48 (13–52.5)	?	?	?	Xenoestrogen
β-Zearalenol	–	0.6 (0.032–13)	?	?	?	Xenoestrogen
Zeranol	α-Zearalanol	48–111	?	?	?	Xenoestrogen
Taleranol	β-Zearalanol	16 (13–17.8)	14	0.8	0.9	Xenoestrogen
Zearalenone	ZEN	7.68 (2.04–28)	9.45 (2.43–31.5)	?	?	Xenoestrogen
Zearalanone	ZAN	0.51	?	?	?	Xenoestrogen
Bisphenol A	BPA	0.0315 (0.008–1.0)	0.135 (0.002–4.23)	195	35	Xenoestrogen
Endosulfan	EDS	<0.001–<0.01	<0.01	?	?	Xenoestrogen
Kepone	Chlordecone	0.0069–0.2	?	?	?	Xenoestrogen
o,p'-DDT	–	0.0073–0.4	?	?	?	Xenoestrogen
p,p'-DDT	–	0.03	?	?	?	Xenoestrogen
Methoxychlor	p,p'-Dimethoxy-DDT	0.01 (<0.001–0.02)	0.01–0.13	?	?	Xenoestrogen
HPTE	Hydroxychlor; p,p'-OH-DDT	1.2–1.7	?	?	?	Xenoestrogen
Testosterone	T; 4-Androstenolone	<0.0001–<0.01	<0.002–0.040	>5000	>5000	Androgen
Dihydrotestosterone	DHT; 5α-Androstanolone	0.01 (<0.001–0.05)	0.0059–0.17	221–>5000	73–1688	Androgen
Nandrolone	19-Nortestosterone; 19-NT	0.01	0.23	765	53	Androgen
Dehydroepiandrosterone	DHEA; Prasterone	0.038 (<0.001–0.04)	0.019–0.07	245–1053	163–515	Androgen
5-Androstenediol	A5; Androstenediol	6	17	3.6	0.9	Androgen
4-Androstenediol	–	0.5	0.6	23	19	Androgen
4-Androstenedione	A4; Androstenedione	<0.01	<0.01	>10000	>10000	Androgen
3α-Androstanediol	3α-Adiol	0.07	0.3	260	48	Androgen
3β-Androstanediol	3β-Adiol	3	7	6	2	Androgen
Androstanedione	5α-Androstanedione	<0.01	<0.01	>10000	>10000	Androgen
Etiocholanedione	5β-Androstanedione	<0.01	<0.01	>10000	>10000	Androgen
Methyltestosterone	17α-Methyltestosterone	<0.0001	?	?	?	Androgen
Ethinyl-3α-androstanediol	17α-Ethynyl-3α-adiol	4.0	<0.07	?	?	Estrogen
Ethinyl-3β-androstanediol	17α-Ethynyl-3β-adiol	50	5.6	?	?	Estrogen
Progesterone	P4; 4-Pregnenedione	<0.001–0.6	<0.001–0.010	?	?	Progestogen
Norethisterone	NET; 17α-Ethynyl-19-NT	0.085 (0.0015–<0.1)	0.1 (0.01–0.3)	152	1084	Progestogen
Norethynodrel	5(10)-Norethisterone	0.5 (0.3–0.7)	<0.1–0.22	14	53	Progestogen
Tibolone	7α-Methylnorethynodrel	0.5 (0.45–2.0)	0.2–0.076	?	?	Progestogen
Δ^{4}-Tibolone	7α-Methylnorethisterone	0.069–<0.1	0.027–<0.1	?	?	Progestogen
3α-Hydroxytibolone	–	2.5 (1.06–5.0)	0.6–0.8	?	?	Progestogen
3β-Hydroxytibolone	–	1.6 (0.75–1.9)	0.070–0.1	?	?	Progestogen
Footnotes: ^{a} = (1) Binding affinity values are of the format "median (range)" (# (#–#)), "range" (#–#), or "value" (#) depending on the values available. The full sets of values within the ranges can be found in the Wiki code. (2) Binding affinities were determined via displacement studies in a variety of in-vitro systems with labeled estradiol and human ERα and ERβ proteins (except the ERβ values from Kuiper et al. (1997), which are rat ERβ). Sources: See template page.

== History ==
The first nonsteroidal antiestrogen was discovered by Lerner and coworkers in 1958. Ethamoxytriphetol (MER-25) was the first antagonist of the ER to be discovered, followed by clomifene and tamoxifen.

== See also ==
- Antiestrogen withdrawal response
- Estrogen synthesis inhibitor
