= Androgen receptor degrader =

Type of drug

A (selective) androgen receptor degrader or downregulator (SARD) is a type of drug which interacts with the androgen receptor (AR) such that it causes the AR to be degraded and thus downregulated. They are under investigation for the treatment of prostate cancer and other androgen-dependent conditions.

As of 2017, dimethylcurcumin (ASC-J9), a SARD, is under development for the treatment of acne vulgaris.

In addition, several PROTACs degraders targeting the androgen receptor have been tested in the clinic:

1. Bavdegalutamide (ARV-110): Developed by Arvinas, this PROTAC is currently in phase 2 clinical trials and has shown encouraging results for patients with metastatic castration-resistant prostate cancer.
2. Luxdegalutamide (ARV-766) Developed by Arvinas, this second-generation AR PROTAC has advanced to phase II clinical trials. It was designed to overcome some limitations of ARV-110, particularly in targeting the AR L702H mutation.
3. Gridegalutamide (CC-94676, AR-LDD): Initially developed by Celgene and now under Bristol Myers Squibb (BMS), this AR PROTAC is in phase I clinical trials for patients with metastatic castration-resistant prostate cancer (mCRPC).

== See also ==
- Androgen deprivation therapy
