= G1 Therapeutics =

Pharmaceutical company

- Traded as: Nasdaq: GTHX (2017-24)
- Industry: Pharmaceuticals
- Founded: 2008; 18 years ago
- Founders: Norman Sharpless; Kwok-Kin Wong
- Headquarters: North Carolina, United States
- Key people: Jack Bailey (CEO); Terry Murdock (COO); John Umstead V (CFO); Raj Malik, M.D. (CMO); Andrew Perry (CCO); Mark Avagliano (CBO)
- Products: Cosela
- Owner: Pharmacosmos; (2024–present)
- Number of employees: 170 (Dec. 2022)
- Website: g1therapeutics.com

G1 Therapeutics, Inc. is an American biopharmaceutical company headquartered in Research Triangle Park, North Carolina. The company specializes in developing and commercializing small molecule therapeutics for the treatment of patients with cancer.

== History ==
G1 Therapeutics was co-founded in 2008 by Norman Sharpless, 15th Director of the National Cancer Institute, and Kwok-Kin Wong, to develop and commercialize drug candidates discovered at, and licensed from, Sharpless' lab at the University of North Carolina at Chapel Hill. Early investors in G1 included Hatteras Venture Partners, and Fred Eshelman, founder of PPD, Inc. Other early investors included AstraZeneca's venture capital fund MedImmune Ventures, and Cormorant Asset Management.

G1 went public on May 17, 2017 and trades on the NASDAQ under the ticker symbol GTHX. On September 30, 2020, the company announced CEO, Mark Velleca, will be stepping down on January 1, 2021, and is to be replaced by Jack Bailey, former President of U.S. pharmaceuticals and vaccines for GlaxoSmithKline.

In September 2024, it was announced that Pharmacosmos had completed its purchase of G1 Therapeutics.

== Pipeline ==
=== Trilaciclib – G1T28 ===
Trilaciclib, a small molecule CDK4/6 inhibitor, is a first-in-class, FDA-designated Breakthrough therapy designed to improve outcomes for cancer patients being treated with chemotherapy. The drug's first targeted indication is small cell lung cancer (SCLC). Patients receiving chemotherapy as part of SCLC treatment frequently experience chemotherapy-induced myelosuppression. In three randomized, placebo-controlled SCLC trials, trilaciclib, when administered to patients before chemotherapy, significantly reduced the occurrence of chemotherapy-induced myelosuppression and the need for supportive care. In June 2020, G1 filed a New Drug Application (NDA) with the Food and Drug Administration (FDA). The application was granted Priority Review with a Prescription Drug User Fee Act (PDUFA) date set for February 15, 2021. In September 2020, G1 launched an expanded access program providing SCLC patients access to trilaciclib while the drug is under FDA review. The FDA approved trilaciclib for use in SCLC on February 12, 2021. In March 2021, trilaciclib was added to the National Comprehensive Cancer Network (NCCN) Clinical Practice Guidelines in Oncology (NCCN Guidelines) as an appropriate prophylactic option to decrease the incidence of chemotherapy-induced myelosuppression for patients undergoing chemotherapy for extensive-stage small-cell lung cancer.

Trilaciclib is one of several novel agents under review for breast cancer treatment as part of the I-SPY series of clinical trials organized by Quantum Leap Healthcare Collaborative.

In October 2020, G1 initiated a Phase 3 registrational study (NCT04607668 - PRESERVE 1) evaluating the impact of trilaciclib on myelopreservation and antitumor efficacy in patients receiving chemotherapy for metastatic colorectal cancer. In March 2021, the company initiated a Phase 3 registrational study (NCT04799249 - PRESERVE 2) evaluating trilaciclib in patients receiving first- or second-line gemcitabine and carboplatin chemotherapy for locally advanced, unresectable, or metastatic triple-negative breast cancer. In April 2021, G1 initiated a Phase 2 study (NCT04863248 – PRESERVE 4) evaluating trilaciclib in patients with metastatic non-small cell lung cancer who are receiving the chemotherapy agent docetaxel. In May 2021, G1 initiated a Phase 2 study (NCT04887831 – PRESERVE 3) evaluating trilaciclib in patients with metastatic bladder cancer who are receiving chemotherapy followed by avelumab.

=== Rintodestrant – G1T48 ===
Rintodestrant, an oral selective estrogen receptor degrader (SERD), is being developed as a treatment for ER-Positive, HER2-Negative advanced breast cancer, both as monotherapy and in combination with palbociclib, a CDK 4/6 inhibitor marketed by Pfizer as Ibrance.

=== Lerociclib – G1T38 ===
Lerociclib is a potent, selective oral CDK4/6 inhibitor. Preclinical and early clinical data have demonstrated that lerociclib is differentiated from other CDK4/6 inhibitors based on its favorable safety profile and ability to be dosed continuously with less dose-limiting neutropenia.

== Products ==
Cosela: On February 12, 2021, the FDA approved trilaciclib (brand name Cosela) as a treatment to reduce the frequency of chemotherapy-induced myelosuppression for patients receiving certain types of chemotherapy for extensive-stage small-cell lung cancer.

== Collaborations ==
- In June 2020, G1 entered into a commercialization agreement with Boehringer Ingelheim to co-promote trilaciclib for SCLC in the United States and Puerto Rico.
- In August 2020, Simcere Pharmaceuticals licensed the development and commercialization rights to trilaciclib for greater China.
- G1 has a non-exclusive clinical supply agreement with Pfizer to provide palbociclib for its rintodestrant/palbociclib breast cancer trial.
- In July 2020, G1 entered into a licensing agreement for lerociclib with EQRx. The license provides exclusive rights to develop the drug for the USA, Europe, Japan, and other global markets, excluding the Asia-Pacific region (except Japan).
- In June 2020, G1 licensed the rights to develop lerociclib in the Asia-Pacific region to Genor Biopharma.
- In August 2020, G1 licensed the rights to its preclinical CDK2 inhibitor program to ARC Therapeutics.

== Footnotes ==
- Tan, A.R. et al., November 2019, Trilaciclib plus chemotherapy versus chemotherapy alone in patients with metastatic triple-negative breast cancer: a multicentre, randomised, open-label, phase 2 trial, The Lancet, Oncology, Volume 20, Issue11, Pages 1587-1601.
- Weiss, J.M., et al., October 1, 2019, Myelopreservation with the CDK4/6 inhibitor trilaciclib in patients with small-cell lung cancer receiving first-line chemotherapy: a phase Ib/randomized phase II trial. Annals of Oncology, 30(10), Pages 1613-1621.
- Davey, D., et al., December 21, 2020, Trilaciclib prior to chemotherapy and atezolizumab in patients with newly diagnosed extensive-stage small cell lung cancer: a multicentre, randomised, double-blind, placebo-controlled phase II trial, International Journal of Cancer, doi:10.1002/ijc.33453.
- Hart, L., et al., Myelopreservation with Trilaciclib in Patients Receiving Topotecan for Small Cell Lung Cancer. Results from a Randomized, Double-Blind, Placebo-Controlled Phase II Study, Advances in Therapy, 29 October 2020, doi:10.1007/s12325-020-01538-0.
- Sorrentino, J. A., et al., July 2017, Trilaciclib (G1T28), a CDK4/6 inhibitor, enhances the efficacy of combination chemotherapy and immune checkpoint inhibitor treatment in preclinical models, American Association for Cancer Research, 2017 Proceedings.
- He, S. et al., April 26, 2017, Transient CDK4/6 inhibition protects hematopoietic stem cells from chemotherapy-induced exhaustion, Science Translational Medicine, DOI: 10.1126/scitranslmed.aal3986.
- Lai, A. Y., et al., October 1, 2020, CDK4/6 inhibition enhances antitumor efficacy of chemotherapy and immune checkpoint inhibitor combinations in preclinical models and enhances T-cell activation in patients with SCLC receiving chemotherapy, Journal for Immunotherapy of Cancer, doi:10.1136/jitc-2020-000847.
- Chabner, B. A., Longo, D. L., 2018, Cancer Chemotherapy, Immunotherapy and Biotherapy: Principles and Practice, 6th Ed. Lippincott Williams & Wilkins (LWW).
