= Palbociclib =

Medication for HR+ HER2– breast cancer

Clinical data
- Pronunciation: /ˌpælboʊˈsaɪklɪb/ PAL-boh-SYE-klib
- Trade names: Ibrance, others
- Other names: PD-0332991
- AHFS/Drugs.com: Monograph
- MedlinePlus: a615013
- License data: US DailyMed: Palbociclib
- Pregnancy category: AU: D
- Routes of administration: By mouth
- ATC code: L01EF01 (WHO)

Legal status
- Legal status: AU: S4 (Prescription only); CA: ℞-only; UK: POM (Prescription only); US: ℞-only; EU: Rx-only

Pharmacokinetic data
- Bioavailability: 46%
- Protein binding: 85%
- Metabolism: Liver (CYP3A, SULT2A1, glucuronidation)
- Elimination half-life: 29 (±5) hours
- Excretion: 74% feces, 18% urine

Identifiers
- IUPAC name: 6-Acetyl-8-cyclopentyl-5-methyl-2-{[5-(1-piperazinyl)-2-pyridinyl]amino}pyrido[2,3-d]pyrimidin-7(8H)-one
- CAS Number: 571190-30-2
- PubChem CID: 5330286
- DrugBank: DB09073
- ChemSpider: 4487437
- UNII: G9ZF61LE7G
- KEGG: D10372
- ChEBI: CHEBI:85993
- ChEMBL: ChEMBL189963
- PDB ligand: LQQ (PDBe, RCSB PDB)
- CompTox Dashboard (EPA): DTXSID40972590
- ECHA InfoCard: 100.238.221

Chemical and physical data
- Formula: C_{24}H_{29}N_{7}O_{2}
- Molar mass: 447.543 g·mol^{−1}
- 3D model (JSmol): Interactive image
- SMILES: O=C2N(c1nc(ncc1/C(=C2/C(=O)C)C)Nc3ncc(cc3)N4CCNCC4)C5CCCC5
- InChI: InChI=1S/C24H29N7O2/c1-15-19-14-27-24(28-20-8-7-18(13-26-20)30-11-9-25-10-12-30)29-22(19)31(17-5-3-4-6-17)23(33)21(15)16(2)32/h7-8,13-14,17,25H,3-6,9-12H2,1-2H3,(H,26,27,28,29); Key:AHJRHEGDXFFMBM-UHFFFAOYSA-N

Palbociclib, sold under the brand name Ibrance among others, is an anti-cancer medication used for the treatment of HR-positive and HER2-negative breast cancer. It was developed by Pfizer. It is a selective inhibitor of the cyclin-dependent kinases CDK4 and CDK6. Palbociclib was the first CDK4/6 inhibitor to be approved as a cancer therapy.

The most common side effects include neutropenia (low blood levels of neutrophils, a type of white blood cell that fights infection), infections, leucopenia (low white blood cell counts), tiredness, nausea (feeling sick), stomatitis (inflammation of the lining of the mouth), anemia (low red blood cell counts), diarrhea, alopecia (hair loss), and thrombocytopenia (low blood platelet counts). The most common severe side effects include neutropenia, leucopenia, infections, anemia, tiredness, and increased blood levels of liver enzymes (aspartate and alanine transaminases).

== Medical uses ==
Palbociclib is indicated for the treatment of adults with hormone receptor-positive, human epidermal growth factor receptor 2-negative advanced or metastatic breast cancer in combination with an aromatase inhibitor as initial endocrine-based therapy; or fulvestrant in people with disease progression following endocrine therapy.

Palbociclib is indicated in combination with inavolisib and fulvestrant for the treatment of adults with endocrine-resistant, PIK3CA-mutated, hormone receptor-positive, human epidermal growth factor receptor 2-negative, locally advanced or metastatic breast cancer, as detected by an FDA‑authorized test, following recurrence on or after completing adjuvant endocrine therapy.

Palbociclib is indicated in combination with trastuzumab, with or without pertuzumab, and endocrine therapy for the maintenance treatment of adults with hormone receptor-positive, human epidermal growth factor receptor 2‑positive locally advanced or metastatic breast cancer following induction treatment.

== Adverse effects ==
The most common side effects include neutropenia (low blood levels of neutrophils, a type of white blood cell that fights infection), infections, leucopenia (low white blood cell counts), tiredness, nausea (feeling sick), stomatitis (inflammation of the lining of the mouth), anemia (low red blood cell counts), diarrhea, alopecia (hair loss), and thrombocytopenia (low blood platelet counts). The most common severe side effects include neutropenia, leucopenia, infections, anemia, tiredness, and increased blood levels of liver enzymes (aspartate and alanine transaminases). Leukopenia and anemia are also frequent among patients taking palbociclib. More than 10% of patients also experience side effects such as fatigue, nausea, diarrhea, respiratory infection, headache, thrombocytopenia, vomiting, and decreased appetite.

== Mechanisms of resistance ==
=== Resistance to palbociclib ===
FDA- and EMA-approval for palbociclib hinges upon the clinical trials' results regarding progression-free survival (PFS). However, though data has proven promising (one study had p-values very close to the significance threshold which, with further clinical trials, may be able to demonstrate statistical significance), there is as of 2019 no significant improvement evident in overall survival (OS) when taking palbociclib. For example, in the PALOMA-2 trial, more than 70% of patients who were treated with palbociclib and letrozole progressed by 40 months. This has impeded the drug's worldwide acceptance as economic analyses have not found palbociclib to be cost-effective.

=== De novo resistance ===
De novo resistance to palbociclib implicates a variety of targets both upstream and downstream of the CDK4/6 to Rb pathway. Overexpression of the transcription factor E2F2 is capable of promoting resistance to CDK4/6 inhibition more than just loss of Rb alone (the direct downstream target of CDK4/6). Palbociclib is less effective in patients whose breast cancer cells overexpress cyclin E1 or E2, and Brk (breast tumor-related kinase). Brk is an intracellular kinase that is overexpressed in 60% of breast cancers and whose amplification leads to increased phosphorylation of Y88 of the p27 protein, as well as increases the cyclin D and CDK4 activity, thereby rendering the cancer cells more resistant to palbociclib.

A 2018 study found that mutations in a pathway completely unrelated to the CDK4/6-Rb axis are also implicated in resistance to palbociclib. Loss of the FAT1 tumor suppressor promoted resistance to CDK4/6 inhibitors through the Hippo pathway, a signaling pathway known to function as a tumor suppressor. Previously, FAT1 had been suggested to be a tumor suppressor and oncogene, though never before explicitly linked to resistance. The team found that FAT1 suppressed cells required significantly higher doses of CDK4/6 inhibitors in order to block proliferation of breast cancer cells in vivo.

=== Resistance due to endocrine therapy ===
Palbociclib is indicated in HR+, HER2- metastatic breast cancer cells. Because CDK4/6 inhibition acts directly downstream of the endocrine therapy targets, cross-therapy resistance could possibly develop as a result of patient progression on hormone-therapy. In general, however, endocrine-resistant tumors are able to maintain sensitivity to CDK4/6 inhibition, with particular success witnessed with patients given combination therapy of palbociclib with endocrine therapy. For example, the PALOMA-3 trial which studied the benefit of palbociclib and fulvestrant vs. fulvestrant alone found that the combined treatment regimen improved PFS in both patients with an ESR1 mutation and those with ESR1 wildtype ctDNA. Such results indicate that CDK4/6 inhibitors are effective irrespective of ESR1 mutation status, a marker that otherwise would reveal a patient to be endocrine-resistant.

Certain manifestations of endocrine therapy resistance may further sensitize the breast cancer to CDK4/6 inhibitors. For example, deficiencies in mismatch repair caused by the MutL mutation in ER+ breast cancer evades CHK2-mediated inhibition of CDK4, thereby leading to endocrine resistance. CDK4/6 inhibitors, however, have been demonstrated to be highly effective in MutL-defective ER+ breast cancer cells, and MutL bears potential as a biomarker for identifying patients highly suitable for treatment with CDK4/6 inhibitors.

=== Other mechanisms of resistance ===
Researchers at the Dana Farber Institute found that breast cancer cells that developed resistance to palbociclib were resensitized to the drug after a seven-day "treatment holiday". Scientists linked the initial development of resistance to an increase in expression of CDK6 (but not CDK4, the other target of palbociclib), with the specific mechanism of CDK6 upregulation originating from suppression of the TGF-β pathway via the miR-432-5p microRNA. Scientists made this discovery after noticing that, in the lab, all breast cancer cells in the dish were found to acquire resistance at a similar time, a phenomenon contrary to classical models of acquiring resistance in which one or two cells become resistant and then expand to encompass more of the tumor as they divide. These palbociclib-resistance cells also did not contain a particular mutation, but rather became resistant and continued to spread this resistance to neighboring cells via exosomes. While the mechanism of this resistance has not yet been elucidated, it opens an avenue for further research into a completely novel method through which cancer cells acquire resistance. On the other hand, this suggests that patients which seemingly progress on palbociclib could benefit from longer-term treatment following a treatment holiday in which their tumors are "reset".

There are a variety of means through which cancer cells become resistant to palbociclib, with mechanisms of resistance involving multiple targets and processes throughout the pathway in which palbociclib operates. Previous research estimates that breast cancer cells show adaptation against palbociclib as early as 72 hours post-treatment. Evidence for this was "shown to be mediated by non-canonical activation of cyclin D1/CDK2 complexes, which in turn induced a recovery of cyclin E2 expression and [subsequent] S-phase entry despite CDK4/6 inhibition" upstream of these two targets. Furthermore, it is estimated that approximately 10% of patients have primary resistance to CDK4/6 inhibitors (resistance prior to drug therapy). For example, patients who display evidence of functional Rb loss at baseline are not likely to benefit from CDK4/6 inhibition, nor are patients who display baseline evidence of increased cyclin E1 expression, or a high CCNE1/RB ratio.

== Mechanism of action ==
It is a selective inhibitor of the cyclin-dependent kinases CDK4 and CDK6.

In the G1 phase of the cell cycle, mammalian cells must pass a checkpoint, known as the restriction point "R", in order to complete the cell cycle and divide. CDK4 and CDK6 complex with Cyclin D drive the phosphorylation of the retinoblastoma protein, Rb, which allows the cell to pass R and commit to division. Regulation of one or more proteins involved in this checkpoint is lost in many cancers. However, by inhibiting CDK4/6, palbociclib ensures that the cyclin D-CDK4/6 complex cannot aid in phosphorylating Rb. This prevents the cell from passing R and exiting G1, and in turn from proceeding through the cell cycle.

== Clinical trials ==
=== HR+ breast cancer ===
The PALOMA-3 trial announced in April 2015 that the addition of palbociclib was superior to fulvestrant alone for progression-free survival.

In the phase II PALOMA-1 trial reported at the April 2014 annual meeting of the American Association for Cancer Research, the addition of palbociclib to letrozole was shown to significantly slow the progression of advanced cancer (median progression-free survival increased from 10.2 months to 20.2 months), but was not shown to have a statistically significant effect on increasing patients' overall survival times.

Pfizer announce on May 31, 2020, the results of a preplanned efficacy and futility analysis. The results indicate that, when used in combination with post-surgery endocrine therapy, it "is unlikely to show a statistically significant improvement in the primary endpoint of invasive disease-free survival (iDFS)." The trial was conducted on male and female patients with HR-positive, HER2-negative early stage breast cancer.

=== Active clinical trials ===
According to the NIH National Cancer Institute there are currently 39 active clinical trials testing palbociclib on its own or in combination with other medications. While a majority of these are exploring the further uses of palbociclib to treat breast cancer, other trials are investigating the potential applications of palbociclib to head and neck cancers, non-small cell lung cancer, recurring brain metastasis, squamous cell carcinoma, central nervous system tumors, and other solid tumor types.

In December 2017, Pfizer announced that the PALOMA-2 trial, an ongoing phase III trial combining palbociclib with letrozole, showed a 44% reduction in risk of disease progression among trial subjects. The trial has also demonstrated greater than a year's improved median progression free survival for patients on the combined therapy (as compared to letrozole on its own). PALOMA-2 median patient follow-up time now exceeds three years, making it the longest traceable data for phase III study of a CDK4/6 inhibitor.

Palbociclib is currently in Phase 2 clinical trials as a combination treatment with oral SERD's for ER+/HER2- breast cancer. Studies include palbociclib plus G1 Therapeutic's rintodestrant and Zentalis's Zn-c5.

== Drugs with a similar mechanism of action ==
Palbociclib has several direct competitors currently on the market or in clinical trials. In September 2017, abemaciclib, another selective CDK4/6 inhibitor owned and manufactured by Eli Lilly, was approved for HR-positive, HER2-negative advanced metastatic breast cancer both in combination with fulvestrant and as a monotherapy. In March 2017, the FDA also approved ribociclib, owned by Novartis, as a combination therapy with aromatase inhibitors for indications similar to those of palbociclib and ribociclib. Notably, ribociclib seems to also have an inhibitory effect on Cyclin D3/CDK6 activity. G1 Therapeutics also has a CDK4/6 inhibitor, trilaciclib, which is up for FDA approval (target decision date of February 15, 2021) for use in small cell lung cancer.

== Society and culture ==
=== Legal status ===
The drug was reviewed and approved under the US Food and Drug Administration's (FDA) accelerated Priority Review and Breakthrough Therapy designation programs on February 3, 2015, as a treatment (in combination with letrozole) for people with estrogen receptor positive (ER+) advanced breast cancer. This was an accelerated approval.

In March 2017, the FDA granted regular approval to palbociclib for hormone receptor (HR) positive, human epidermal growth factor receptor 2 (HER2) negative advanced or metastatic breast cancer, in combination with an aromatase inhibitor.

A phase III trial, PALOMA-2, was fully enrolled by February 2015 and reported positive results in April 2016. The results of PALOMA-2 trial, published in November 2016, showed significantly longer progression-free survival in patients on palbociclib in combination with letrozole, compared to patients on letrozole and placebo. Progression-free survival was assessed by radiologically-confirmed disease progression by RECIST criteria or death during the study. At the time of publication, there was insufficient data on overall survival, and a final analysis is planned after a total of 390 deaths occur per protocol and in agreement with regulatory agencies. Of note, it was noted that the addition of palbociclib caused higher rates of myelotoxic events in the study.

The drug was approved for use in the European Union in November 2016, as a treatment for hormone receptor (HR) positive, human epidermal growth factor receptor 2 (HER2) negative locally advanced or metastatic breast cancer, either in combination with an aromatase inhibitor or, for women who have received prior endocrine therapy, in combination with fulvestrant. In pre- or perimenopausal women, a luteinizing hormone releasing hormone agonist should also be given.

In December 2017, palbociclib, was accepted for use by the NHS after going through the Scottish Medicines Consortium's process for medicines used to treat very rare and end-of-life breast cancer.

=== Economics ===
Palbociclib "can be ordered through select" specialty pharmacies and "sells for $9,850 for 30 days or $118,200 for a year's supply before discounts." According to a statement by the New York–based Pfizer the price "is not the cost that most patients or payors pay" since most prescriptions are dispensed through health plans, which negotiate discounts for medicines or get government-mandated price concessions. In the United States specialty pharmacies fill prescriptions for drugs that are usually high cost.

Pfizer reported revenue of US$4.753 billion for Ibrance in 2023.

==== Resistance to cost ====
In February 2017, the National Institute for Health and Care Excellence (NICE) in the United Kingdom published a statement stating that the cost of Ibrance (approximately US$3700/28 days) did not make the added health benefits worth the cost. It was stated that with the side effects caused by Ibrance, it was not a cost-effective medication for NICE to endorse. At the time, a year's treatment with palbociclib and a drug such as fulvestrant was priced at US$106,105 (£79,650). In November 2017 NICE announced that, after negotiation with Pfizer, the price would be discounted, and the drug would be recommended for use.
