= Boehringer Ingelheim =

German pharmaceutical company

C.H. Boehringer Sohn AG & Co. KG

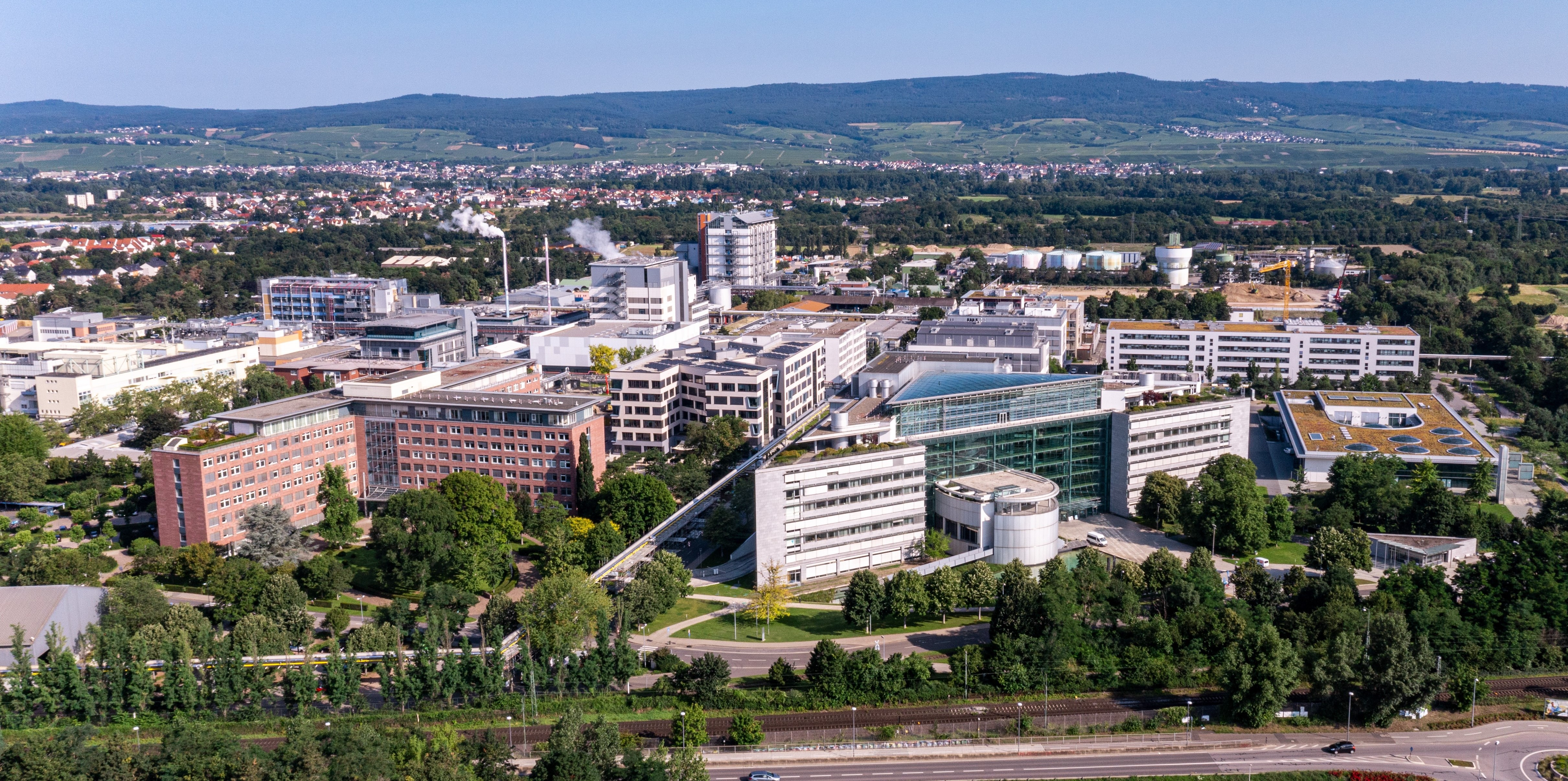
- Boehringer Ingelheim's headquarters in Ingelheim, Germany
- Type: Private
- Industry: Pharmaceuticals
- Founded: 1885; 141 years ago in Ingelheim am Rhein, Germany
- Founder: Albert Boehringer
- Headquarters: Ingelheim, Germany
- Area served: Worldwide
- Key people: Shashank Deshpande (chairman of the board); Michael Schmelmer (vice chairman); Paola Casarosa; Frank Hübler; Armin Wiesler; Harsha Deshmukh
- Products: Pharmaceuticals and Animal Health
- Revenue: ▲€27.8 billion (2025)
- Owner: Boehringer, Liebrecht and von Baumbach families
- Number of employees: 54,300 (2025)
- Website: boehringer-ingelheim.com

C.H. Boehringer Sohn AG & Co. KG is the parent company of the Boehringer Ingelheim group, which was founded in 1885 by Albert Boehringer (1861–1939) in Ingelheim am Rhein, Germany. As of 2018, Boehringer Ingelheim is one of the world's largest pharmaceutical companies, and the largest private one.

Headquartered in Ingelheim, it operates globally with more than 54,000 employees in 76 countries. Unlike most large pharmaceutical companies which are listed, the company is private and fully owned by the Boehringer, Liebrecht and von Baumbach families. The company's key areas of interest are: respiratory diseases, metabolism, immunology, oncology and diseases of the central nervous system. Boehringer Ingelheim is a full member of the European Federation of Pharmaceutical Industries and Associations (EFPIA). The corporate logo of Boehringer Ingelheim depicts a stylized rendition of the central section of the imperial palace of Charlemagne.

== History ==
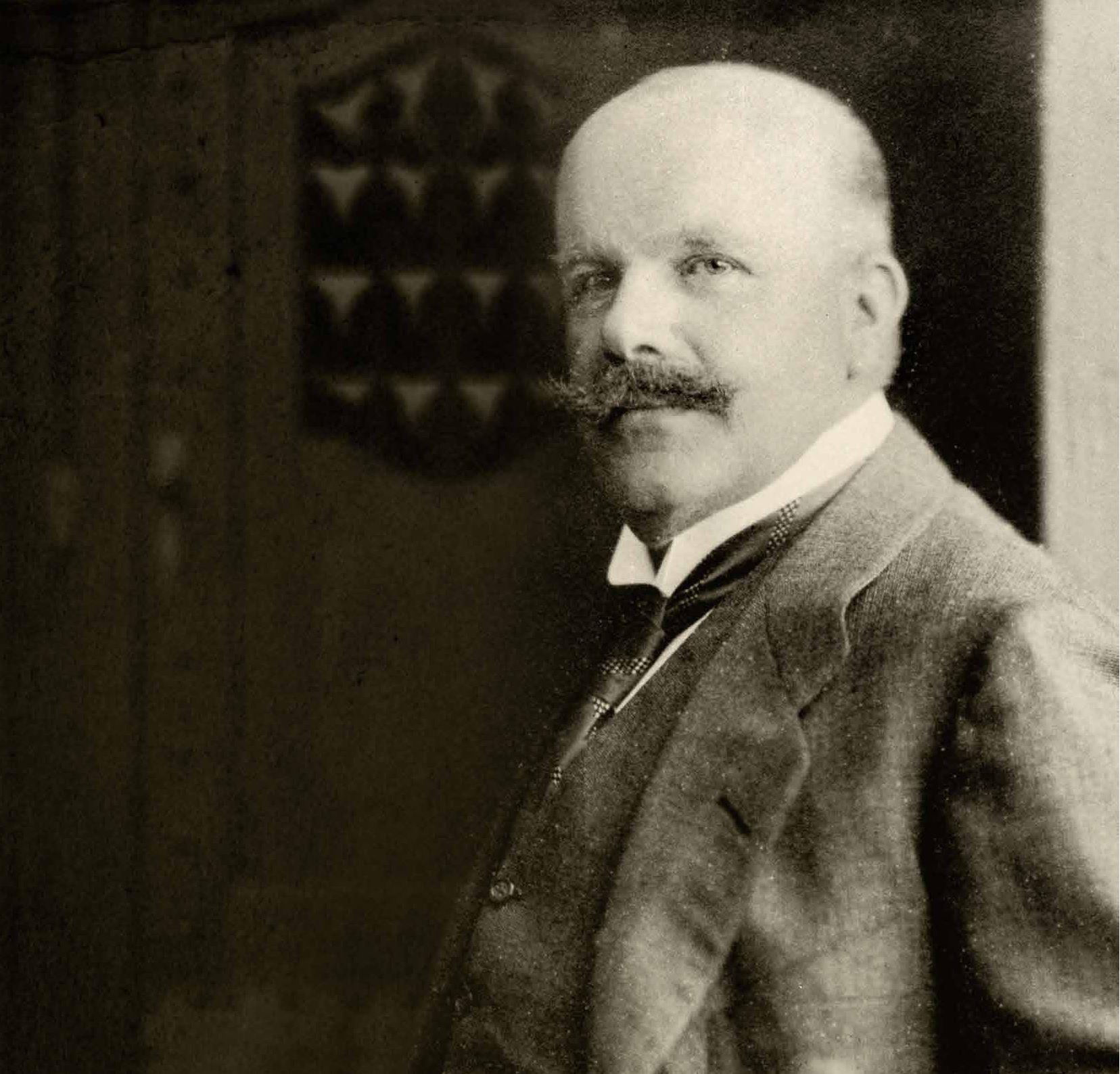
Albert Boehringer, founder of Boehringer Ingelheim, in August 1885

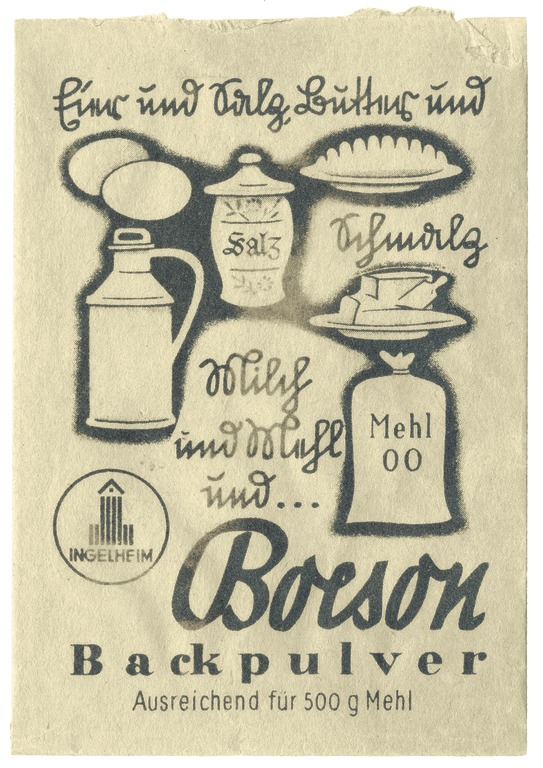
Poster for Boeson baking powder, the first patented Boehringer Ingelheim product in year 1895

=== 1885–1999 ===
- 1885: Albert Boehringer buys a small tartar factory in Ingelheim am Rhein; work begins on 1 August.
- 1886: The factory commences production of tartaric acid for use in the food industry (e.g. in baking powder and carbonated beverages).
- 1893: Albert Boehringer renames the company C. H. Boehringer Sohn (CHBS) after his father, Christoph Heinrich Boehringer.
- 1893: While experimenting with the production of citric acid, lactic acid is formed. Albert Boehringer develops this process, with the intention of producing lactic acid on a larger scale.
- 1895: Lactic acid is produced on an industrial scale, and is successful commercially.
- 1917: Professor Heinrich Otto Wieland, chemist, future Nobel Prize winner and cousin of Albert Boehringer, sets up the company's research department.
- 1928: Albert Boehringer purchases Dr. Karl Thomae, a company based in Winnenden near Stuttgart.
- 1946: Dr. Karl Thomae GmbH is re-opened in Biberach an der Riss with a staff of 70 people.
- 1954: The company hires former Nazi Fritz Fischer after he is released from jail. Fischer was convicted of war crimes and crimes against humanity at the Nuremberg Trials.

The company supplied the most potent ingredient of Agent Orange.

- 1955: The Animal Health division is established as the company acquires Pfizer's veterinary programme.
- 1966: A subsidiary company named Boehringer Ingelheim Hellas was founded and the company started business in Greece. A new factory was built close to Athens at Koropi
- 1971: The foreign subsidiary, Boehringer Ingelheim Pharmaceuticals, Inc is founded in Ridgefield, Connecticut (USA). This site is soon expanded, and becomes the company's North American research centre.
- 1985: The Research Institute of Molecular Pathology (IMP) is established in Vienna through a collaboration with Genentech; it opens in 1988.
- 1986: The biotechnological centre in Biberach begins production of biopharmaceuticals from cell cultures.
- 1998: The merging of Boehringer Ingelheim KG and Dr. Karl Thomae GmbH founds Boehringer Ingelheim Pharma KG.

=== 2000–2016 ===
In 2004, the company acquired STEAG microParts GmbH. In December of the same year the company announced the acquisition of the outstanding shares of Boehringer Ingelheim Shionogi Vetmedica.

In June 2008, the company announced its intention to acquire Actimis Pharmaceuticals for $515 million, depending on the performance of Actimis' leading asthma compound AP768.

In 2009, through its US subsidiary, Boehringer Ingelheim Vetmedica Inc., acquired a significant portion of the Fort Dodge Animal Health business from Pfizer.

In 2010, BI, through its Boehringer Ingelheim Japan Investment GK subsidiary, acquired all outstanding shares of SSP CO., Ltd, with Nippon Boehringer Ingelheim Co., Ltd already holding 60.2% of SSP CO's shares.

In August 2012, the company acquired FX125L and the somatotaxin programme from Funxional Therapeutics for an undisclosed sum.

In May 2015, the company acquired the investigational drug PXS4728A from Pharmaxis’. In July, the company sold its Roxane business to Hikma Pharmaceuticals Plc for $2.65 billion ($1.18 billion in cash and issue 40 million new Hikma shares). The company also agreed to make cash payments of up to $125 million based on performance milestones. On the same day the company announced it would partner with Hanmi Pharmaceutical to develop and commercialise HM61713, a third generation treatment for EGFR mutation-positive lung cancer. Boehringer also terminated its collaboration with Vitae Pharmaceuticals on a new BACE program for Alzheimer's.

The company sold the rights to Faldaprevir, a HCV protease inhibitor to Trek Therapeutics.

In July 2016, the company sold the commercialisation rights to BI 655066 (Risankizumab), to AbbVie for $595 million upfront as well as undisclosed milestone payments and royalties. BI 655066 is a drug in late-stage testing for psoriasis, and in earlier testing for Crohn's disease, psoriatic arthritis and asthma. In September of the same year the company announced it would acquire ViraTherapeutics for €210 million ($230 million), a developer of oncolytic virus therapies, dependent on the success of Phase I trials.

=== 2016 – Sanofi asset swap ===
In June 2016, the company announced it had struck an asset-swap deal with Sanofi, Boehringer would sell its consumer health division (valuing it at €6.7 billion) and €4.7 billion in cash, whilst acquiring the Merial animal health division (valuing it at €11.4 billion / $12.4 billion). The deal could mean that Boehringer is now one of the animal healthcare global leaders. In September of the same year, Amgen announced it would purchase the rights to Boehringer Ingelheims Phase I bispecific T-cell engager compound (BI 836909, now AMG 420) for use in the treatment of multiple myeloma. As part of the asset swap, Boehringer and Merial sold a number of assets to Ceva Santé Animale - namely some animal health vaccines and pharmaceuticals from the Merial portfolio for swine, bovine and companion animals, as well as some intellectual property, manufacturing processes and R&D activities. In October 2016 the company sold its US pet vaccines business and a manufacturing plant for $885 million, to Eli Lilly's Elanco Animal Health division.

=== 2018–onwards ===
In April 2018, the company announced that it would launch an immuno-oncology partnership with OSE Immunotherapeutics worth up-to-$1.4 billion, focussing on developing OSE's late-preclinical-stage candidate OSE-172, a checkpoint inhibitor antibody designed to treat solid tumors. In the same month Boehringer announced a partnership with Topas Therapeutics and their virus-based vectors. In mid-September the company exercised its option to acquire viral cancer therapy developer, ViraTherapeutics, for €210 million ($245 million).

In March 2019, Boehringer announced it would acquire ICD Therapeutics. In July, subsidiary company Boehringer Ingelheim Pharmaceuticals, Inc. announced it had acquired Amal Therapeutics SA, boostings the business' focus on cancer immunotherapy and vaccine treatments.

In May 2020, the business announced it would acquire Northern Biologics Inc. which focuses on therapeutic antibodies targeting tumours. In June, the business announced it would sell off part of its stake in London-listed Hikma Pharmaceuticals (28 million out of a 40 million share holding) for around $800 million. In July, the company announced it would acquire Global Stem cell Technology (GST), boosting its animal health business. In December, Boehringer announced it would acquire Labor Dr. Merk & Kollegen, boosting its immuno-oncology therapy range including Vesicular Stomatitis Virus and cancer vaccines platforms and Swiss-based NBE Therapeutics, adding drug candidates including a treatment being used in early trials against triple-negative breast cancer and lung cancer, for $1.5 billion.

In June 2020, Boehringer and G1 Therapeutics announced a co-promotion agreement for trilaciclib (Cosela), a CDK4/6 inhibitor designed to prevent chemotherapy-induced myelosuppression. The agreement targets small cell lung cancer, will initially run for three years, and covers the United States and Puerto Rico.

In September 2021, the company announced it would acquire Abexxa Biologics, boosting its cancer immunotherapy research.

In 2023, the World Intellectual Property Organization (WIPO)’s Madrid Yearly Review ranked Boehringer's number of marks applications filled under the Madrid System as 4th in the world, with 118 trademarks applications submitted during 2023.

== Business overview ==
Boehringer Ingelheim works in human pharmaceuticals, animal health, and biopharmaceuticals. The group consists of 145 affiliated companies with around 50,000 employees in 2017 in all continents. Research and development facilities were in five sites and 20 production plants in 13 countries. The research and development facilities are located in Biberach (Germany), Ridgefield (Connecticut), Vienna, Kobe, and Milan (closed in 2017). Over 8,000 employees work for Boehringer Ingelheim in research and development.

== Operational sites ==
Boehringer Ingelheim is a globally operating company, with 146 subsidiaries around the globe. The company's largest site and corporate headquarters is in Ingelheim am Rhein near Mainz and Frankfurt, Germany. Their main business regions are Europe, North America and Asia. The Research Institute of Molecular Pathology in Vienna (Austria), founded in 1985, has had Boehringer Ingelheim as its main sponsor since 1993.

=== Closure of Bedford plant ===
In 2011, Ben Venue Laboratories in Bedford, Ohio, a division of Boehringer Ingelheim, voluntarily shut down after a U.S. Food and Drug Administration inspectors' report that found the plant had rusty tools, mold, and a barrel of 'unknown liquid', later found to be urine. The company invested US$300,000,000 to upgrade the drug manufacturing plant, and limited production resumed in October 2012. However, on 3 October 2013, Ben Venue announced that it would be ceasing production by the end of 2013 due to being unable to "return to sustainable production."

== Collaborative research and partnership with Google Quantum AI ==
Boehringer Ingelheim is involved in publicly funded collaborative research projects with other industrial and academic partners. One example in the area of non-clinical safety assessment is the InnoMed PredTox. The company is expanding its activities in joint research projects within the framework of the Innovative Medicines Initiative of EFPIA and the European Commission. On January 11, 2021, Boehringer Ingelheim announced a collaborative agreement with Google Quantum AI, focusing on researching and implementing cutting-edge use cases for quantum computing in pharmaceutical research and development (R&D), specifically including molecular dynamics simulations. Boehringer Ingelheim is the first pharmaceutical company worldwide to join forces with Google in quantum computing in a newly established Quantum Lab of Boehringer Ingelheim. Boehringer Ingelheim is also a founding member of the Quantum Technology and Application Consortium (QUTAC).

== Products ==
=== Key lines ===
Prescription Medicines:

- Actilyse (alteplase)
- Aggrenox (dipyridamole / acetylsalicylic acid)
- Alna / Flomax (tamsulosin) [sold to Sanofi]
- Aptivus (tipranavir)
- Berodual (ipratropium bromide / fenoterol)
- Combivent (ipratropium bromide / salbutamol)
- Cosela (trilaciclib)
- Gilotrif / Giotrif (afatinib)
- Jardiance (empagliflozin)
- Jentadueto / TrajentaDuo (linagliptin / metformin)
- Metalyse (tenecteplase)
- Micardis (telmisartan)
- Micardis Plus / Micardis HCT (telmisartan / hydrochlorothiazide)
- Mirapex / Sifrol (pramipexole)
- Ofev / Vargatef (Nintedanib)
- Mobic / Movalis (meloxicam)
- Pradaxa (dabigatran etexilate)
- Spiriva (tiotropium bromide)
- Trajenta / Tradjenta (linagliptin)
- Twynsta (telmisartan / amlodipine)
- Viramune (nevirapine)

Consumer Health Care (sold to Sanofi):

- Antistax (red vine leaf extract)
- Bisolvon (bromhexine)
- Buscopan / Buscapina (hyoscine butylbromide)
- Dulcolax (bisacodyl)
- Zantac (ranitidine)—75 and 150 mg tablets; 300 mg tablets, syrup and solution for injection are manufactured by GlaxoSmithKline
- Mucoangin / Mucosolvan (ambroxol)
- Pharmaton (standardized ginseng extract, vitamins, minerals, trace elements)
- Silomat / Bisoltussin / Bisolvon Antitussive (dextromethorphan)
- Thomapyrin (acetylsalicylic acid, paracetamol, caffeine)
- BoxaGrippal (ibuprofen/pseudoephedrine)

Animal Health:

- CircoFLEX (porcine circovirus vaccine type 2, killed Baculovirus vector)
- Duramune (a line of pet vaccines)- sold to Elanco U.S.; discontinued in Canada
- Metacam (meloxicam)
- MycoFLEX (Mycoplasma hyopneumoniae bacterin)
- Vetmedin (pimobendan)
- Pexion (imepitoin)

Also in companion animal portfolio: Purevax feline vaccines, Recombitek canine vaccine, Imrab rabies vaccine, NexGard (afoxolaner), NexGard Spectra (afoxolaner/milbemycin oxime), NexGard Combo (esafoxolaner/eprinomectin/praziquantel), Heartgard-30 Plus (ivermectin/pyrantel pamoate), Immiticide (melarsomine), Senvelgo (velagliflozin)

=== Product pipeline ===
Boehringer Ingelheim's product pipeline targets lung disease, cancer, and hepatitis C.

Drug Name	Description	Potential Indication	Testing Phase
Olodaterol	Long-acting beta-agonist	Chronic obstructive pulmonary disease (COPD)	Approved
Tiotropium	Long acting muscarinic antagonist	Cystic fibrosis (CF) / asthma. Already approved for chronic obstructive pulmonary disease (COPD)	Approved
Nintedanib	Triple angiokinase inhibitor, simultaneously blocks VEGFR, FGFR, PDGFR	Idiopathic pulmonary fibrosis (IPF) / non-small cell lung cancer (NSCLC) / ovarian cancer	Phase III
Afatinib	Irreversible ErbB family blocker	Breast cancer / head and neck cancer. Already approved for non-small cell lung cancer (NSCLC)	Phase III
Volasertib	PLK1 antagonist	Various cancer types	Phase III
Deleobuvir (formerly BI 207127)	NS5B RNA-dependent polymerase inhibitor	Hepatitis C	Phase III
Faldaprevir (formerly BI 201335)	NS3/4A protease inhibitor	Hepatitis C	Phase III
Empagliflozin	SGLT-2-inhibitor	Diabetes mellitus type II	Approved
Idarucizumab	Humanized antibody fragment (FAB), specific reversal agent to dabigatran	Reversal of dabigatran-induced anticoagulation in case of an emergency	Phase III

=== Litigation ===
In October 2012 Boehringer Ingelheim settled a "qui tam" (whistleblower) case with the U.S. government for $95 million alleging "off-label" marketing of the drugs Aggrenox, Atrovent, Combivent, and Micardis for uses that weren't approved by the US Food and Drug Administration and were not covered by federal health care programs.

In August 2012, Pradaxa claims filed in the federal court were consolidated in a multi-district litigation in the Southern District of Illinois before Chief Judge David R. Herndon. On 28 May 2014, a $650 million settlement was announced on behalf of approximately 3,900 claimants who were injured by the drug Pradaxa made by Boehringer Ingelheim Pharmaceuticals, Inc. The drug is alleged to cause severe bleeding events and/or hemorrhaging to those who were taking the drug.

In October 2023 Boehringer Ingelheim was ordered to pay a 10 million Euro fine for illegal price fixing that had gone on globally over a period of nearly fifteen years. Boehringer bears the largest share of an antitrust fine totaling € 13.4 million. Anyone affected by its anti-competitive behavior may claim damages, competition regulators stressed.

== Ownership and leadership ==
As a private company, Boehringer Ingelheim (BI) is not required to disclose detailed financial information publicly; the owners have considered an IPO and ruled it out. In 2006, the Chairman of the Shareholders’ Committee Dr Heribert Johann retired and Christian Boehringer took over the position as chairperson of the board of directors. As of 2018 Christian Boehringer remains in this position. In 2015, then-CFO Hubertus von Baumbach took over the position of Chairman of the Board of Managing Directors, a CEO position, to replace Andreas Barner who had taken the position in 2009.

== See also ==
- Robert Boehringer
