= Waun Ki Hong =

Korean-born medical professor

Waun Ki Hong (August 13, 1942 – January 2, 2019) was a Korean-born American medical oncologist, physician-scientist, and academic leader whose career centered on head and neck oncology, thoracic oncology, cancer prevention, and translational clinical research. He spent much of his professional career at The University of Texas MD Anderson Cancer Center, where he served as chair of the Department of Thoracic/Head and Neck Medical Oncology from 1984 to 2005 and as head of the Division of Cancer Medicine from 2001 until his retirement in 2014. He also served as an American Cancer Society Professor and held the Samsung Distinguished University Chair in Cancer Medicine.

== Early life and education ==
Hong was born in 1942 in Cheongpyeong, South Korea, the sixth of seven children. Later biographical accounts state that his childhood was shaped by the Korean War, particularly a near-fatal episode of bacterial peritonitis he connected to his interest in medicine. He also credited his brother, Suk Ki Hong, MD, PhD, with stimulating his interest in a medical career. He completed premedical studies at Yonsei University College of Engineering and Science, then received his medical degree from Yonsei University School of Medicine in 1967. He subsequently fulfilled compulsory national service as a flight surgeon in the Korean Air Force, caring for wounded soldiers transported from Vietnam to hospitals in Korea.

In 1970, Hong moved to the United States with his family to continue his medical training. His early U.S. training included a rotating internship at Bronx-Lebanon Hospital in New York, followed by residency training at the Veterans Administration Medical Center in Boston. During this period, his exposure to large numbers of veterans with head and neck cancers helped shape his decision to pursue oncology.

== Early medical career ==
After completing residency in 1973, Hong entered a medical oncology fellowship at Memorial Sloan Kettering Cancer Center. He later returned to the Boston VA Medical Center, where he served as chief of medical oncology. Before joining MD Anderson, he also held faculty appointments at Boston University School of Medicine and Tufts University School of Medicine.

Hong joined MD Anderson Cancer Center in 1984 as chief of the Section of Head and Neck Oncology. At MD Anderson, he emphasized translational research and bridging preclinical findings to clinical trial design and patient care. In 2001, he became the head of the Division of Cancer Medicine, a role he held until 2014 and one marked by both scientific leadership and a sustained commitment to mentoring junior investigators and clinicians.

== Research and scientific contributions ==
Hong’s work is most closely associated with three areas: organ-preserving therapy in head and neck cancer, chemoprevention, and biomarker-guided clinical trial design in lung cancer.

=== Organ preservation in laryngeal cancer ===
Hong was a co-study chair of the Veterans Affairs Laryngeal Cancer Study Group trial that compared induction chemotherapy plus radiation with surgery plus radiation in patients with advanced laryngeal cancer. Published in the New England Journal of Medicine in 1991, the study found that laryngeal preservation could be achieved in many patients without reducing survival compared with the surgical approach. The trial demonstrated that preservation of speech and swallowing function could be incorporated into treatment goals alongside tumor control, particularly for patients who would otherwise have required a total laryngectomy. The laryngeal-preservation trial was influential in broader discussions of organ-preserving cancer treatment, and Hong’s approach remains a standard of care and informed organ-preservation-informed strategies in other cancers.

=== Chemoprevention ===
Hong also contributed to early clinical research in chemoprevention, the practice of using certain drugs or substances to inhibit, delay, or reverse cancer development. In a 1986 study in the New England Journal of Medicine, he and colleagues reported responses to 13-cis-retinoic acid in patients with oral leukoplakia, a premalignant lesion associated with oral cancer. This study provided proof of principle for preventing cancer by treating precursor lesions, helping establish chemoprevention as an area of clinical investigation.

=== Biomarker-guided therapy and the BATTLE trial ===
Later in his career, Hong led the BATTLE trial, or Biomarker-integrated Approaches of Targeted Therapy for Lung Cancer Elimination, a prospective, adaptively randomized trial in previously treated non-small-cell lung cancer that used real-time tumor profiling to help guide therapy assignment. Because the trial incorporated biopsy-based molecular information into treatment selection, it has often been described as an early example of precision oncology in lung cancer and highlighted Hong’s efforts to incorporate tumor biology into clinical trial design.

== Leadership and service ==
Hong held leadership positions in major cancer research and clinical organizations. He served as president of the American Association for Cancer Research from 2001 to 2002 and participated in more than 25 AACR committees, task forces, and scientific working groups. He served on the AACR Board of Directors, chaired the Annual Meeting Program Committee, and contributed to the editorial leadership of multiple AACR journals, including Cancer Research, Clinical Cancer Research, Cancer Epidemiology, Biomarkers & Prevention, Cancer Prevention Research, and Cancer Discovery.

In addition to his AACR roles, Hong served on the American Society of Clinical Oncology Board of Directors from 2006 to 2009, as chair of the Prevention, Clinical and Therapeutic Subcommittee for the National Cancer Institute (NCI) External Board of Scientific Advisors (BSA), the NCI Translational Research Working Group (TRWG), the U.S. FDA Oncologic Drug Advisory Committee (ODAC), and as chair of the Subcommittee of Clinical Investigations for the National Cancer Advisory Board (NCAB). He was also a member of the National Academy of Medicine and a Fellow of the American College of Physicians.

== Mentorship and academic influence ==
Beyond his academic and medical roles, Hong placed a strong emphasis on teaching and mentoring, both formally as a division head and informally through personal guidance. At MD Anderson, he trained more than 60 young oncology fellows from Korea, about 20 of whom later became chairs or directors of cancer centers in Korea. He also created the MD Anderson Physician-Scientist Advanced Scholar Program, which allows fellows to extend training for an additional year devoted to research.

== Publications, editorial work, and honors ==
Hong wrote or contributed to more than 700 peer-reviewed publications and held editorial roles in several major oncology journals; he also edited oncology texts, including Head and Neck Cancer: A Multidisciplinary Approach and Holland-Frei Cancer Medicine.

His contributions to cancer research have been recognized through national and international awards, including the Claude Jacquillat Award from the International Congress on Anti-Cancer Treatment (ICACT) in France and the Ho-Am Prize from the Samsung Foundation in Korea. From the American Society of Clinical Oncology (ASCO) he received the David Karnofsky Award and the American Cancer Society Award. He also was selected to serve as a member of the ASCO Board of Directors. In 2012, he received the American Cancer Society Medal of Honor for Outstanding Clinical Research.

His honors included the AACR-Richard and Hinda Rosenthal Foundation Award in 1993, the Claude Jacquillat Award from the International Congress on Anti-Cancer Treatment (ICACT) in 1999, the AACR Joseph H. Burchenal Award in 2000, ASCO’s David A. Karnofsky Award in 2000, the AACR-Cancer Research and Prevention Foundation Award for Excellence in Cancer Prevention Research in 2003, and the American Cancer Society Medal of Honor in 2012. He was elected an inaugural Fellow of the AACR Academy in 2013 and received the AACR Margaret Foti Award for Leadership and Extraordinary Achievement in Cancer Research in 2016. AACR also established the AACR-Waun Ki Hong Award in 2016 in his honor.

== Selected peer-reviewed original research articles ==
- Zhang J, Fujimoto J, Zhang J, Wedge DC, Song X, Zhang J, Seth S, Chow CW, Cao Y, Gumbs C, Gold KA, Kalhor N, Little L, Mahadeshwar H, Moran C, Protopopov A, Sun H, Tang J, Wu X, Ye Y, William WN, Lee JJ, Heymach JV, Hong WK, Swisher S, Wistuba II, Futreal PA. Intratumor heterogeneity in localized lung adenocarcinomas delineated by multiregion sequencing. Science 346(6206):256-9, 2014.
- Kadara H, Shen L, Fujimoto J, Saintigny P, Chow CW, Lang W, Chu Z, Garcia M, Kabbout M, Fan YH, Behrens C, Liu DA, Mao L, Lee JJ, Gold KA, Wang J, Coombes KR, Kim ES, Hong WK, Wistuba II. Characterizing the molecular spatial and temporal field of injury in early stage smoker non-small cell lung cancer patients after definitive surgery by expression profiling. Cancer Prev Res (Phila) 6(1):8-17, 2013.
- Wu X, Ye Y, Rosell R, Amos CI, Stewart DJ, Hildebrandt MAT, Roth JA, Minna JD, Gu J, Lin J, Buch SC, Nukui T, Ramirez Serrano JL, Taron M, Cassidy A, Lu C, Chang JY, Lippman SM, Hong WK, Spitz MR, Romkes M, Yang P. Genome-wide association study of survival in non-small cell lung cancer patients receiving platinum-based chemotherapy. J Natl Cancer Inst 103: 817-825, 2011.
- Gold KA, Kim ES, Lee JJ, Wistuba II, Farhangfar CJ, Hong WK. The BATTLE to Personalize Lung Cancer Prevention through Reverse Migration. Cancer Prev Res (Phila). 4(7):962-72, 2011
- Kies MS, Holsinger FC, Lee JJ, William WN, Glisson BS, Lin HY, Lewin JS, Ginsberg LE, Gillaspy KA, Massarelli E, Byers L, Lippman SM, Hong WK, El-Naggar AK, Garden AS, Papadimitrakopoulou V. Induction chemotherapy and cetuximab for locally advanced squamous cell carcinoma of the head and neck: results from a phase II prospective trial. J Clin Oncol 28(1): 8-14, 2010.
- Papadimitrakopoulou V, Izzo JG, Liu DD, Myers J, Ceron TL, Lewin J, William WN, Atwell A, Lee JJ, Gillenwater A, El-Naggar A, Wu X, Lippman SM, Hittelman WN, Hong WK. Cyclin D1 and cancer development in laryngeal premalignancy patients. Cancer Prev Res (Phila) 2(1):14-21, 2009.
- Spitz MR, Hong WK, Amos CI, Wu X, Schabath MB, Dong Q, Shete S, Etzel CJ. A risk model for prediction of lung cancer. J Natl Cancer Inst 99(9):715-26, 2007.
- Hong WK, Spitz MR, Lippman SM. Cancer chemoprevention in the 21st century: genetics, risk modeling, and molecular targets. J Clin Oncol 18(21 Suppl):9S-18S, 2000.
- Hong WK, Lippman SM, Itri LM, Karp DD, Lee JS, Byers RM, Schantz SP, Kramer AM, Lotan R, Peters LJ, Dimery IW, Brown BW, Goepfert H. Prevention of second primary tumors with isotretinoin in squamous cell carcinoma of the head and neck. N Engl J Med 323:795-801, 1990.

== Death and legacy ==
Hong died on January 2, 2019, at his home in California at the age of 76.

Hong’s work is most often associated with organ-preserving treatment in head and neck cancer, clinical chemoprevention, and biomarker-guided therapy in lung cancer, as well as mentorship of early-career oncologists and physician-scientists.
