= Spectrum Pharmaceuticals =

American biopharmaceutical company

Spectrum Pharmaceuticals, Inc.
- Company type: Public
- Traded as: Nasdaq: SPPI
- Industry: Pharmaceuticals
- Headquarters: Boston, Massachusetts, U.S.
- Key people: Tom Riga (CEO)
- Revenue: ▼US$109.33 million (2018)
- Owner: Assertio Holdings; (2023–present)
- Number of employees: ▲164 (December 31, 2021)
- Website: sppirx.com

Spectrum Pharmaceuticals, Inc. is an American biopharmaceutical company located in Boston, MA. It develops and markets drugs for treatments in hematology and oncology.

After a deal valued at $248 million was announced in April 2023, Assertio Holdings announced that it had completed its acquisition of the Massachusetts-based company on July 31.

== Drugs ==
In January 2019, Spectrum Pharmaceuticals sold its entire portfolio of hematology and oncology related products to Acrotech Biopharma USA, Inc., a New Jersey-based subsidiary of India's Aurobindo Pharma Ltd. The seven drugs had a combined sales of $76.4 million in the first three quarters of 2018.

The products sold were Fusilev (levoleucovorin), Folotyn (pralatexate injection), Zevalin (ibritumomab tiuxetan), Marqibo (vincristine sulfate LIPOSOME injection), Beleodaq (belinostat) for injection, Evomela (melphalan) for injection, and Khapzory (levoleucovorin).

The divestiture of seven marketed products infused non-dilutive capital back into the organization and enabled Spectrum to further advance its two cornerstone, value driving assets.

=== In development ===
As of 2023, Spectrum has one FDA approved drug (ROLVEDON™ (eflapegrastim) is also formerly known as Rolontis) and one drug in advanced development (Poziotinib).

=== Key Events for Rolvedon ===
On September 9, 2022, FDA approved ROLVEDON™ (formerly known as Rolontis)(eflapegrastim-xnst) injection indicated to decrease the incidence of infection, as manifested by febrile neutropenia, in adult patients with non-myeloid malignancies receiving myelosuppressive anti-cancer drugs associated with clinically significant incidence of febrile neutropenia.

Development timeline for Rolvedon:

Sep 9, 2022 Spectrum announced FDA Approval of Rolvedon (eflapegrastim-xnst) Injection to Decrease the Incidence of Chemotherapy-Induced Neutropenia

April 11, 2022 FDA announced acceptance of Spectrum's re-submission of its Rolontis Biologics License Application (BLA)to FDA.

Aug 6, 2021 Spectrum received a Complete Response Letter (CRL) from FDA for Rolontis (eflapegrastim). FDA cited to manufacturing deficiencies that required the manufacturing facilities to be re-inspected by FDA.

Oct. 24, 2019 Spectrum re-submitted an updated version of its Biologics License Application (BLA)for ROLONTIS (eflapegrastim) to FDA based on 643 early-stage breast cancer patients. This BLA version included additional information in the Chemistry, Manufacturing and Controls (CMC) section.

Mar 18, 2019 After receiving FDA's request for additional (CMC) chemistry-manufacturing-control related information for Rolontis (eflapegrastim), Spectrum voluntarily withdrew its 2018 Biologics License Application (BLA) from FDA as more than 60 days time would have beenneeded to provide the additional CMC-related information FDA required before March 29, 2019, the end date of FDA's initial 60-day review period.

Dec 27, 2018 Spectrum announced its submission of the Biologics License Application to the FDA for Rolontis (eflapegrastim) as a Treatment for Chemotherapy-Induced Neutropenia based on 643 early-stage breast cancer patients.

=== Key Research and Development Events for Poziotinib ===
Poziotinib is a tyrosine kinase inhibitor in development for use in patients with previously treated locally advanced or metastatic non-small cell lung cancer (NSCLC) with HER2 exon 20 insertion mutations.

Nov 28, 2022 Spectrum announced the lay off 75% of R&D staff after FDA New Drug Application (NDA) rejection. Spectrum also announced plans to discontinue development of poziotinib, and to explore “strategic alternatives” for the Poziotinib program.

Nov 25, 2022 Spectrum received a Complete Response Letter from FDA for Poziotinib.

Sep 22, 2022 Spectrum provided an update on Poziotinib following the FDA Oncologic Drugs Advisory Committee (ODAC) Meeting regarding Spectrum's New Drug Application (NDA).

The ODAC voted 9–4 against a Poziotinib approval as the advisers judged the drug's risks outweighed its benefits.

Feb 11, 2022 Spectrum announced FDA acceptance of the New Drug Application (NDA) submitted for Poziotinib

Dec 6, 2021 Spectrum submitted the New Drug Application (NDA) for Poziotinib.

Mar 11, 2021 FDA Grants Fast Track Designation (FTD) to Spectrum for Poziotinib.

Dec 19, 2018 Spectrum announced that based on a subset of data from MD Anderson's ongoing Phase 2 study, FDA did not grant Breakthrough Therapy Designation (BTD) to Poziotinib for the treatment of patients with metastatic non-small cell lung cancer (NSCLC) whose tumors have EGFR exon 20 mutations.

Spectrum's BTD application included data from 30 patients from MD Anderson's Phase 2 study who had failed platinum-based chemotherapy.

Spectrum reported that the MDAnderson data demonstrated a confirmed objective response rate of 40% and median duration of response of 6.6 months.

Spectrum stated the safety profile in this subset was consistent with historical data published on poziotinib and other tyrosine kinase inhibitors. The historical objective response rates for mutation specific NSCLC patients range between 0% and 8% with tyrosine kinase inhibitors and for non-mutation specific NSCLC patients range between 0.8% and 22.9% with other treatments.

2018 Spectrum submits Poziotinib application for Breakthrough Therapy Designation (BTD) to FDA based on data reported on patients treated by John V. Heymach and medical staff at the MD Anderson Cancer Center.

Sep 24, 2018 Spectrum Announced the release of updated Poziotinib data From MD Anderson's Phase 2 Study in Non-Small Cell Lung Cancer Patients.

May 3, 2018 Patent Licensing Agreement announced by and between The University of Texas MD Anderson Cancer Center (MDACC) and Spectrum Pharmaceuticals to cover discoveries by John V. Heymach and Heymach's research staff at MDACC in the future.

The filed patents, if granted, are expected to extend the intellectual property protection to 2037.

Oct 27, 2017 Spectrum highlights Poziotinib Data in Non-Small-Cell Lung Cancer (NSCLC) from research results reported by John V. Heymach and The University of Texas MD Anderson Cancer Center.

At the 18th IASLC World Conference on Lung Cancer in Japan, Spectrum presented data reported by Heymach and the MD Anderson Cancer Center research team illustrating that Poziotinib demonstrated evidence of significant antitumor activity in NSCLC patients with EGFR exon 20 insertion mutations, with interim data showing an Objective Response Rate of 73%.

Evidence of central nervous system (CNS) activity in a patient with CNS metastasis and another with leptomeningeal disease (LMD).

March 17, 2017 First Poziotinib clinical trial patient enrolled by John V. Heymach into the Investigator Study Protocol 2016–0783.

Feb. 23, 2017 John V. Heymach initiated the Investigator IND as the Study Sponsor to of the clinical research, Protocol 2016–0783, “A Phase II Study of Poziotinib in EGFR or HER2 Mutant Advanced Solid Tumors” in collaboration with Spectrum and National Cancer Institute (NCI).
