= Hubertus von Baumbach =

German businessman

- Occupation: Businessman
- Title: Chairman and CEO, Boehringer Ingelheim

Hubertus von Baumbach (born 1968) is a German businessman who is the chairman and CEO of Boehringer Ingelheim, Germany's second largest pharmaceutical company.

== Early life and education ==
The son of Erich von Baumbach and Ulrike Boehringer, Hubertus von Baumbach is also a great-grandson of the company's founder Albert Boehringer.

== Career ==
Baumbach joined Boehringer Ingelheim in 2001.

In November 2015, it was announced that Baumbach, who had been CFO, was appointed as chief executive, succeeding Andreas Barner in June 2016. At the time, this made him the first member of the family at the helm in 25 years. Within his first six months, he launched the biggest acquisition in the company's history (an asset swap deal with French rival Sanofi), followed by a reorganization to give the group a more decentralized divisional structure.

In his capacity at Boehringer Ingelheim, Baumbach was part of Chancellor Angela Merkel’s delegation on three state visits to China.

== Other activities ==
=== Corporate boards ===
- Deutsche Bank, Member of the Advisory Board
- Baden-Württembergische Bank, Member of the Advisory Board
- Landesbank Baden-Württemberg (LBBW), Member of the Advisory Board
- KWS Saat, Member of the supervisory board (2007-2017)

=== Non-profit organizations ===
- Federation of German Industries (BDI), Member of the Presidium (2018-2019)
- German Chemical Industry Association (VCI), Member of the Executive Committee
- Baden-Badener Unternehmer-Gespräche (BBUG), Member of the Board of Trustees
- Cultural Foundation of the Federal States, Member of the Board of Trustees
- Städel Museum, Member of the Administration and the Board of Trustees
- Stiftung Tausendgut, Member of the Board of Trustees
