= Poziotinib =

Chemical compound

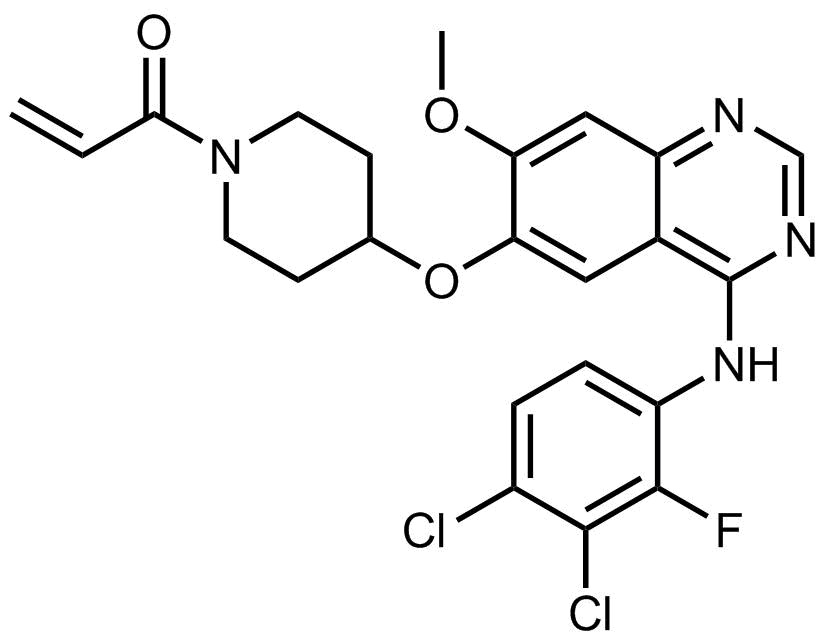

Legal status
- Legal status: experimental

Identifiers
- IUPAC name: 1-[4-[4-(3,4-dichloro-2-fluoroanilino)-7-methoxyquinazolin-6-yl]oxypiperidin-1-yl]prop-2-en-1-one
- CAS Number: 1092364-38-9
- PubChem CID: 25127713
- ChemSpider: 30687714
- UNII: OEI6OOU6IK
- KEGG: D12229
- ChEBI: CHEBI:195559
- CompTox Dashboard (EPA): DTXSID80148853

Chemical and physical data
- Formula: C_{23}H_{21}Cl_{2}FN_{4}O_{3}
- Molar mass: 491.34 g·mol^{−1}
- 3D model (JSmol): Interactive image
- SMILES: COC1=C(C=C2C(=C1)N=CN=C2NC3=C(C(=C(C=C3)Cl)Cl)F)OC4CCN(CC4)C(=O)C=C
- InChI: InChI=1S/C23H21Cl2FN4O3/c1-3-20(31)30-8-6-13(7-9-30)33-19-10-14-17(11-18(19)32-2)27-12-28-23(14)29-16-5-4-15(24)21(25)22(16)26/h3-5,10-13H,1,6-9H2,2H3,(H,27,28,29); Key:LPFWVDIFUFFKJU-UHFFFAOYSA-N

Poziotinib (NOV120101, HM781-36B) is a drug in development by Hanmi Pharmaceutical (in South Korea), Luye Pharma (China), and Spectrum Pharmaceuticals (rest of world) for various cancers.

It is built on an anilino-quinazoline scaffold and inhibits the epidermal growth factor receptors EGFR, HER2/neu, and Her 4 and binds covalently to its targets.

It was discovered at Hanmi; in August 2014 Hanmi exclusively licensed rights in China to the Chinese company Luye Pharma and in February 2015 Hanmi licensed rights in the rest of the world outside of South Korea to Spectrum.

As of 2016 Spectrum had started a Phase II trial of poziotinib a second-line treatment for breast cancer.
