= Deleobuvir =

Chemical compound

Clinical data
- Pregnancy category: N/A

Legal status
- Legal status: Development terminated

Identifiers
- IUPAC name: (2E)-3-(2-{1-[2-(5-Bromopyrimidin-2-yl)-3-cyclopentyl-1-methyl-1H-indole-6-carboxamido]cyclobutyl}-1-methyl-1H-benzimidazol- 6-yl)prop-2-enoic acid
- CAS Number: 863884-77-9
- PubChem CID: 56948249
- ChemSpider: 29773345
- UNII: 58BU988K90
- KEGG: D10554
- ChEMBL: ChEMBL2403318
- CompTox Dashboard (EPA): DTXSID40235516

Chemical and physical data
- Formula: C_{34}H_{33}BrN_{6}O_{3}
- Molar mass: 653.581 g·mol^{−1}
- 3D model (JSmol): Interactive image
- SMILES: CN1C2=C(C=CC(=C2)C(=O)NC3(CCC3)C4=NC5=C(N4C)C=C(C=C5)/C=C/C(=O)O)C(=C1C6=NC=C(C=N6)Br)C7CCCC7
- InChI: InChI=1S/C34H33BrN6O3/c1-40-26-17-22(10-11-24(26)29(21-6-3-4-7-21)30(40)31-36-18-23(35)19-37-31)32(44)39-34(14-5-15-34)33-38-25-12-8-20(9-13-28(42)43)16-27(25)41(33)2/h8-13,16-19,21H,3-7,14-15H2,1-2H3,(H,39,44)(H,42,43)/b13-9+; Key:BMAIGAHXAJEULY-UKTHLTGXSA-N

Deleobuvir (formerly BI 207127) was an experimental drug for the treatment of hepatitis C. It was being developed by Boehringer Ingelheim. It is a non-nucleoside hepatitis C virus NS5B polymerase inhibitor. Deleobuvir was tested in combination regimens with pegylated interferon and ribavirin, and in interferon-free regimens with other direct-acting antiviral agents including faldaprevir.

Data from the SOUND-C2 study, presented at the 2012 AASLD Liver Meeting, showed that a triple combination of deleobuvir, faldaprevir, and ribavirin performed well in HCV genotype 1b patients. Efficacy fell below 50%, however, for dual regimens without ribavirin and for genotype 1a patients.

These results were confirmed in the SOUND-C3 study, presented at the 2013 APASL Liver Conference, which found that 16-week triple therapy with deleobuvir + faldaprevir + ribavirin gave 95% SVR12 in HCV genotype 1b patients but poor virological response in genotype 1a.

In December 2013, Boehringer Ingelheim announced that the development of deleobuvir would not be continued since recent findings from phase III trials did not suggest sufficient efficacy.
