= Albert Boehringer =

German chemist–industrialist and founder of Boehringer Ingelheim

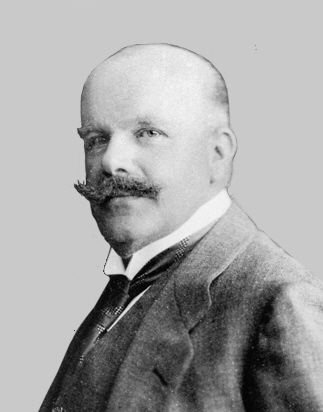
- Boehringer, c. 1905
- Born: Albert Boehringer; August 11, 1861; Stuttgart, Kingdom of Württemberg, now Germany
- Died: March 11, 1939 (aged 77); Nieder-Ingelheim, now Ingelheim am Rhein, Germany
- Occupations: Chemist; industrialist
- Organization: C. H. Boehringer Sohn
- Known for: Founder of Boehringer Ingelheim
- Spouse: Johanna Helene (Helene) Renz
- Children: 8, including Albert (1890–1960) and Ernst (1896–1965)

Albert Boehringer (11 August 1861 – 11 March 1939) was a German chemist and industrialist who founded the chemical and pharmaceutical company C. H. Boehringer Sohn in Nieder-Ingelheim in 1885, the enterprise that later became Boehringer Ingelheim. He pioneered the industrial production of lactic acid by bacterial fermentation (1890s) and launched the firm's first pharmaceutical specialty, Laudanon (1912/1915).

== Life ==
Boehringer was born in Stuttgart and trained in chemistry (including studies at the Ludwig-Maximilians-Universität München). In the summer of 1885 he acquired a small Weinsteinfabrik, tartar factory, in Nieder-Ingelheim; the business was registered on 31 July as Albert Boehringer, Chemische Fabrik, Nieder-Ingelheim. In 1893, he renamed it C. H. Boehringer Sohn to honour his father, Christoph Heinrich Boehringer.

While experimenting with organic acids in the early 1890s, the company discovered that lactic acid could be produced in bulk by means of bacteria, making Boehringer a pioneer of large-scale biotechnological production. Industrial manufacture followed shortly afterward and became an early mainstay of the firm.

From 1912 the company moved into pharmaceuticals. Its first drug, Laudanon (an analgesic based on opium alkaloids), was developed in 1912, with wide market launch in 1915.

In 1917 Boehringer established a formal research department on the advice of the chemist Heinrich Otto Wieland, his cousin, who later won the 1927 Nobel Prize in Chemistry.

To expand pharmaceutical capacity and opiate quotas under the then German Opium Convention, the company acquired Dr. Karl Thomae & Cie. of Winnenden in 1928 (later re-established in Biberach an der Riß after 1946).

Boehringer died in Nieder-Ingelheim on 11 March 1939. Management passed to the second generation, his sons Albert (1890–1960) and Ernst (1896–1965) and his son-in-law Julius Liebrecht.

== Employee welfare and culture ==
Boehringer is noted for early employee welfare policies. A company health-insurance scheme was set up in 1902; by 1910 staff had a right to 14 days of paid vacation with a travel subsidy. To ensure staff truly took a break, they were asked to send a holiday postcard to headquarters. In 1912 a company pension scheme followed, and in 1917 the firm opened a staff canteen. Medium- to long-term employees also received special payments or additional holidays.

== Family ==
In 1889 Boehringer married Johanna Helene (Helene) Renz. The couple had eight children, including Albert (1890–1960) and Ernst (1896–1965), who later led C. H. Boehringer Sohn.

Boehringer's extended family has remained involved with the company; since 2016 the chair/CEO has been his great-grandson Hubertus von Baumbach.

== Honours ==
- Title of Kommerzienrat (Councillor of Commerce), c. 1911.
- Honorary doctorate (Dr. h.c.), Faculty of Mathematics and Natural Sciences, University of Freiburg, awarded on his 60th birthday, 11 August 1921.
- Honorary citizen of Nieder-Ingelheim (1921).

Some sources erroneously attribute the title of Ehrensenator (honorary senator) of the Johannes Gutenberg University Mainz to the founder. The university's official roll shows the honour was awarded in 1951 to his son, Albert Boehringer (1890–1960).

== Legacy ==
In Ingelheim am Rhein, the city where he established the company headquarters, several local streets were named in his and his family's honor, specifically related to the construction of employee housing ("Boehringer-Heimstätten"). The Albertstraße is named after him. Nearby, the Helenenstraße is named after his wife, Helene Boehringer.

Boehringer's 1885 start-up grew into one of the world's largest research-based pharmaceutical groups while remaining family-owned. In 1997 the separate Mannheim family enterprise (Boehringer Mannheim, descended from the founder's grandfather's firm) was acquired by Roche, underscoring the broader Boehringer family's industrial legacy.

== Selected media ==
- Meissner, Martina (11 August 2016). "11.08.1861 – Geburtstag von Albert Boehringer". WDR ZeitZeichen (radio podcast) (in German).

== Gallery ==
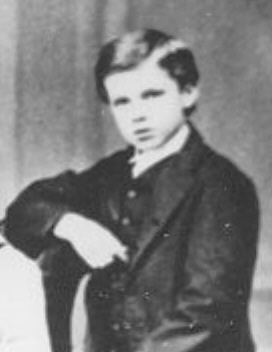
Albert Boehringer as a young man

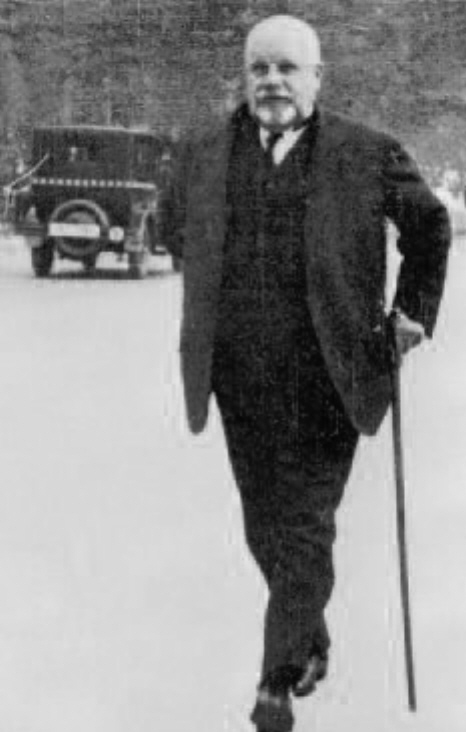
Albert Boehringer

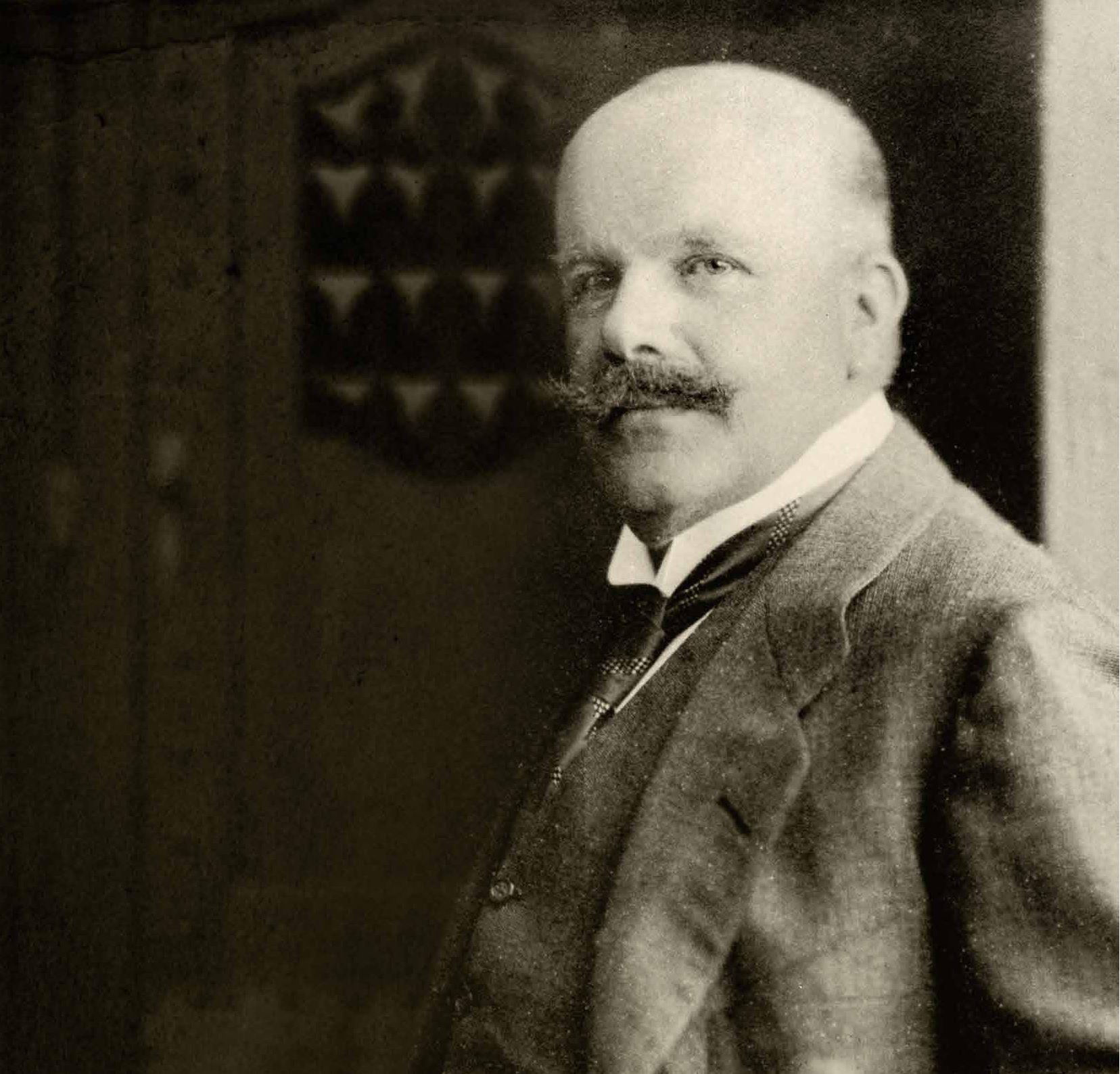
Albert Boehringer

== See also ==
- Boehringer Ingelheim
- Heinrich Otto Wieland
