= Faldaprevir =

Chemical compound

Clinical data
- Other names: BI 201335
- Routes of administration: By mouth
- ATC code: J05AP04 (WHO)

Legal status
- Legal status: Abandoned

Identifiers
- IUPAC name: N-[(Cyclopentyloxy)carbonyl]-3-methyl-L-valyl-(4R)-4-({8-bromo-2-[2-(isobutyrylamino)-1,3-thiazol-4-yl]-7-methoxy-4-quinolinyl}oxy)-N-[(1R,2S)-1-carboxy-2-vinylcyclopropyl]-L-prolinamide
- CAS Number: 801283-95-4
- PubChem CID: 42601552
- DrugBank: DB11808
- ChemSpider: 26327117
- UNII: 958X4J301A
- ChEMBL: ChEMBL1241348
- CompTox Dashboard (EPA): DTXSID20230084

Chemical and physical data
- Formula: C_{40}H_{49}BrN_{6}O_{9}S
- Molar mass: 869.83 g·mol^{−1}
- 3D model (JSmol): Interactive image
- SMILES: CC(C)C(=O)Nc1nc(cs1)c2cc(c3ccc(c(c3n2)Br)OC)O[C@@H]4C[C@H](N(C4)C(=O)[C@H](C(C)(C)C)NC(=O)OC5CCCC5)C(=O)N[C@@]6(C[C@H]6C=C)C(=O)O
- InChI: InChI=1S/C40H49BrN6O9S/c1-8-21-17-40(21,36(51)52)46-34(49)27-15-23(18-47(27)35(50)32(39(4,5)6)44-38(53)56-22-11-9-10-12-22)55-29-16-25(26-19-57-37(43-26)45-33(48)20(2)3)42-31-24(29)13-14-28(54-7)30(31)41/h8,13-14,16,19-23,27,32H,1,9-12,15,17-18H2,2-7H3,(H,44,53)(H,46,49)(H,51,52)(H,43,45,48)/t21-,23-,27+,32-,40-/m1/s1; Key:LLGDPTDZOVKFDU-XUHJSTDZSA-N

Faldaprevir was an experimental drug for the treatment of hepatitis C (HCV). It was being developed by Boehringer-Ingelheim and reached Phase III clinical trials in 2011. Boehringer announced in 2014 that it would not pursue approval of the drug any more because of better HCV treatments having become available.

== Mechanism of action ==
Faldaprevir is a hepatitis C virus protease inhibitor.

== Studies ==
Faldaprevir was tested in combination regimens with pegylated interferon and ribavirin, and in interferon-free regimens with other direct-acting antiviral agents including deleobuvir.

Data from the SOUND-C2 study, presented at the 2012 AASLD Liver Meeting, showed that a triple combination of faldaprevir, deleobuvir, and ribavirin performed well in HCV genotype 1b patients.
