= Norman Sharpless =

American cancer researcher (born 1966)

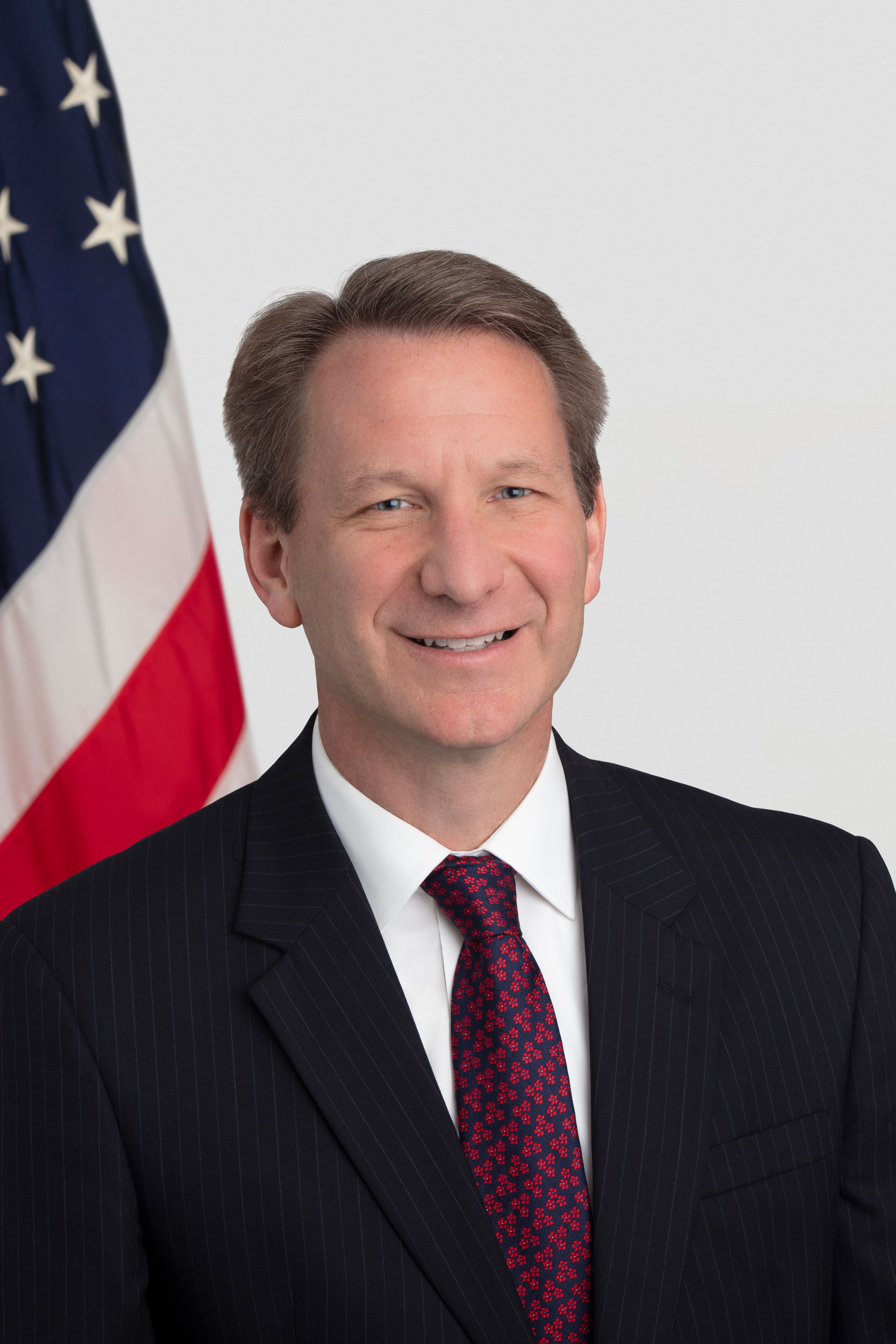
- Sharpless in 2019

15th Director of the National Cancer Institute
- In office October 17, 2017 – April 30, 2022
- President: Donald Trump; Joe Biden
- Preceded by: Harold E. Varmus; Douglas R. Lowy (acting)
- Succeeded by: Monica Bertagnolli

Acting Commissioner of Food and Drugs
- In office April 5, 2019 – November 1, 2019
- President: Donald Trump
- Secretary: Alex Azar
- Preceded by: Scott Gottlieb
- Succeeded by: Brett Giroir (acting)

Personal details
- Born: September 20, 1966 (age 60) Greensboro, North Carolina
- Scientific career
- Education: University of North Carolina at Chapel Hill; University of North Carolina School of Medicine
- Known for: p16LUC model
- Fields: Molecular genetics
- Workplaces: University of North Carolina at Chapel Hill; National Cancer Institute

Norman Edward "Ned" Sharpless (born September 20, 1966) is the previous Director of the National Cancer Institute (NCI). Before that, Sharpless was Professor of Medicine and Genetics Chair, Director of University of North Carolina UNC Lineberger Comprehensive Cancer Center, Molecular Therapeutics, Wellcome Distinguished Professorship in Cancer Research.

Sharpless was named to head the NCI on June 10, 2017, and took office on October 17, 2017. Sharpless also served as Acting Commissioner of the Food and Drugs from April 5, 2019 until November 1, 2019, after which he returned to the NCI. He stepped down from the post at the end of April 2022.

== Education ==
Sharpless studied mathematics at the University of North Carolina at Chapel Hill, where he was a John Motley Morehead Scholar. He earned his medical degree with honors and distinction at the University of North Carolina School of Medicine. He completed his internship and residency at Massachusetts General Hospital in Boston, and a clinical and research fellowship at Dana–Farber Cancer Institute in Boston.

== Career ==
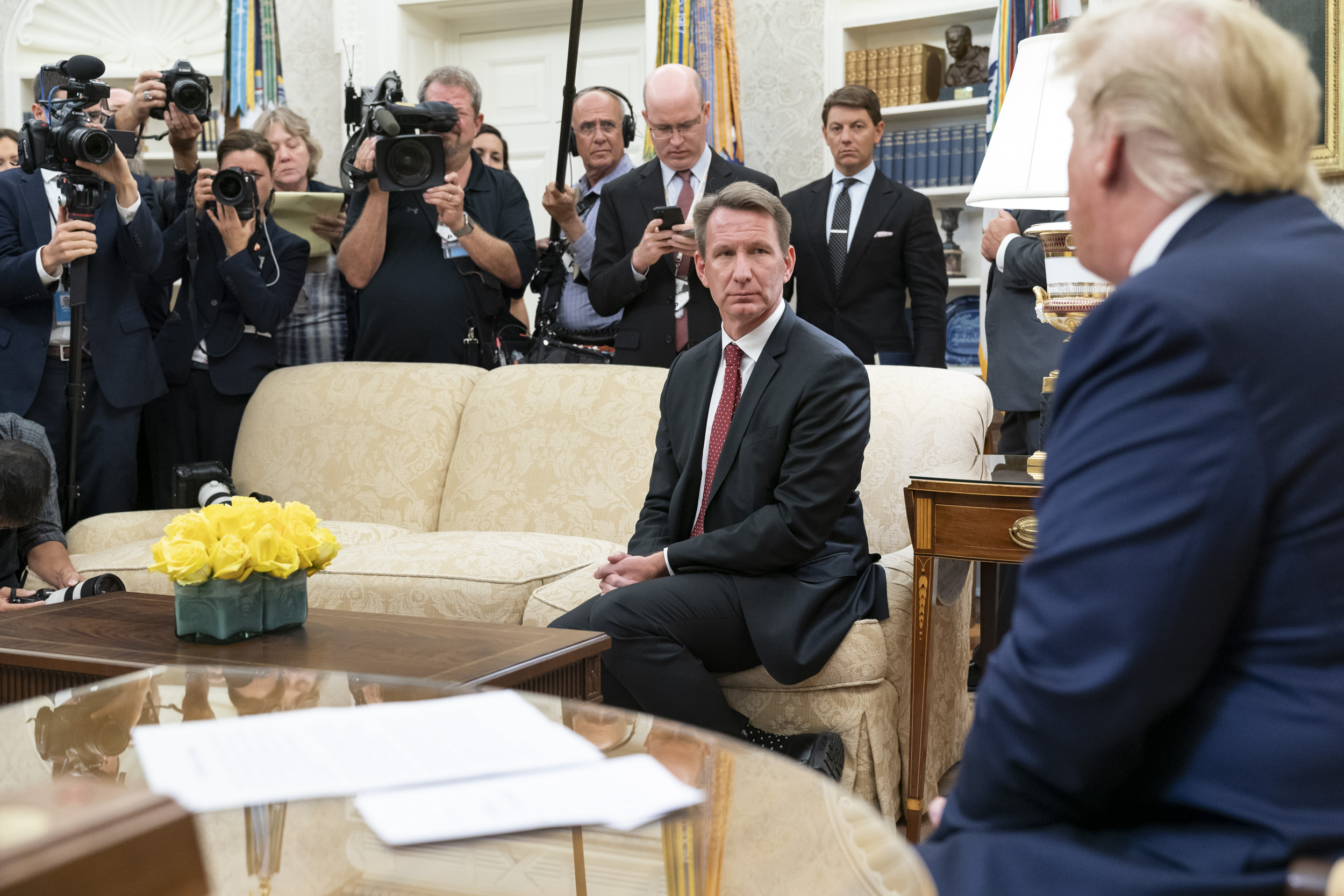
Sharpless, as acting Commissioner of Food and Drugs, in the Oval Office with President Donald Trump in 2019

At the University of North Carolina at Chapel Hill, Sharpless ran a basic science laboratory that utilized genetically engineered mice to study cancer and aging, and was co-founder and co-director of the UNC Lineberger Mouse Phase I Unit. His research focused on how normal cells age and undergo malignant conversion.

In 2009, Sharpless's lab identified p16INK4a expression in human peripheral blood T-lymphocytes as an easily measurable biomarker of human molecular age and developed a clinically applicable assay for potential personalized patient risk assessment, which was featured on BBC News and other international news agencies for its promise to eventually "measure" human aging. The biomarker was subsequently shown to be a clinical outcome predictor in kidney transplant. The biomarker assay was commercialized by a clinical-phase biotech company called Sapere Bio (formerly HealthSpan Dx), founded by Sharpless and his team.

He has published numerous papers that show the role of p16INK4a in shutting down the stem cells that renew the body's various tissues. He is also one of the founders of G1 Therapeutics, listed $GTHX under the NASDAQ, which is a clinical-stage biopharmaceutical company developing small-molecule therapies for the treatment of patients with cancer. Extending upon this work, Sharpless' team developed the p16LUC model, a genetically engineered mouse that 'glows' upon activation of the p16INK4a promoter due to insertion of firefly luciferase in place of the endogenous gene. Use of this system revealed the activation of p16INK4a in tissues surrounding nascent tumors, allowing scientists to non-invasively visualize the formation and progression of spontaneous cancers in living animals. Furthermore, this allele has made it feasible to better understand aging toxicology. Specifically, Ned's lab has used the p16LUC allele to understand how low dose toxic exposure over a lifetime can affect the rate of molecular aging. He is also a founder of Sapere Bio (formerly HealthSpan Diagnostics), a clinical-phase biotechnology company measuring physiologic reserve to improve healthcare.

Most recently, Sharpless with Judith Campisi, PhD, of the Buck Institute for Research on Aging, and colleagues demonstrated In 2016 how chemotherapy triggers cellular senescence, a pro-inflammatory stress response, which promotes the adverse effects of chemotherapy as well as cancer relapse and metastasis. Eliminating the senescent cells in mice prevented the side effects. He has also reported on meta-analyses of GWAS studies of aging and disease, identifying the major histocompatibility complex and the p16INK4a/ARF loci as the most frequently reported disease associated loci in humans.

In 2009, Sharpless and his team were the first to discover altered human INK4/ARF expression as the mechanism for the 9p21.3 genetic risk allele of atherosclerosis. This was first published study identifying the underlying mechanism of 9p21.3, a genetic risk variant with the strongest, and most consistent association with atherosclerosis in multiple, independent, large-scale GWASs (Genome Wide Association Studies). The findings remain to be the most plausible mechanism of 9p21.3 atherosclerosis risk up to this date.

In 2011, Sharpless and his team, using conditional p16INK4a knock-out mouse models, discovered that p16INK4a plays lineage-specific roles of tumor suppression or aging promotion in immune system, providing the first genetic evidence for lineage-specific pleiotropy in immune aging and genetic basis for heterogeneity of human aging and cancer susceptibility.

In 2010 Sharpless's lab reported the first known human circular RNA produced from a long non-coding RNA, and linked its expression to alleles strongly associated with risk of atherosclerosis.

In 2013 Sharpless and his lab cataloged a large list of circular RNAs in human cell lines and mouse tissues using a whole genome sequencing strategy employing RNase R digestion. These were identified as highly stable transcripts, and reported the first link between circular RNAs and ALU Elements. Sharpless coined the term "backsplicing" to refer to the process by which these circular RNAs might be formed.

In August 2013, he was appointed director of UNC Lineberger Comprehensive Cancer Center.

== Publications, awards, professional positions and honors ==
Sharpless has authored or co-authored more than 170 original reports, reviews and book chapters recorded in the PubMed.gov database and has served as an editor of Aging Cell and the Journal of Clinical Investigation. He has 12 issued or pending patents for his inventions. Sharpless' honors include being the 2007 recipient of the Jefferson Pilot Award, the 2009 recipient of the Hettleman Prize for Scholarly Achievement, a 2010 recipient of a Glenn Award for Research in Biological Mechanisms of Aging, and a 2012 "Triangle Business Journal Health Care Hero." He is an elected member of the American Society for Clinical Investigation (ASCI), the nation's oldest honor society for physician-scientists, and the Association of American Physicians.

In 2016, Sharpless was elected to a three-year term on the Association of American Cancer Institutes' board of directors. He is an appointed member of the National Institute of Aging's National Advisory Council on Aging.

== Personal life ==
Sharpless is married with two children. Sharpless' wife, Julie Sharpless, worked as a physician and associate professor at the University of North Carolina. Sharpless currently lives in Washington, D.C.

Government offices
Preceded by Harold E. Varmus; Douglas R. Lowy (acting)	15th Director of the National Cancer Institute; 2017 – present	Incumbent
