= Belvarafenib =

Investigational cancer drug

Clinical data
- Other names: HM95573 GDC5573 RG6185
- Routes of administration: By mouth

Identifiers
- IUPAC name: 4-amino-N-[1-(3-chloro-2-fluoroanilino)-6-methylisoquinolin-5-yl]thieno[3,2-d]pyrimidine-7-carboxamide
- CAS Number: 1446113-23-0
- PubChem CID: 89655386
- IUPHAR/BPS: 11544
- ChemSpider: 64878400
- UNII: 31M3WLJ3KG
- ChEMBL: ChEMBL3977543

Chemical and physical data
- Formula: C_{23}H_{16}ClFN_{6}OS
- Molar mass: 478.93 g·mol^{−1}
- 3D model (JSmol): Interactive image
- SMILES: CC1=C(C2=C(C=C1)C(=NC=C2)NC3=C(C(=CC=C3)Cl)F)NC(=O)C4=CSC5=C4N=CN=C5N
- InChI: InChI=InChI=1S/C23H16ClFN6OS/c1-11-5-6-13-12(7-8-27-22(13)30-16-4-2-3-15(24)17(16)25)18(11)31-23(32)14-9-33-20-19(14)28-10-29-21(20)26/h2-10H,1H3,(H,27,30)(H,31,32)(H2,26,28,29); Key:KVCQTKNUUQOELD-UHFFFAOYSA-N

Belvarafenib (developed by Hanmi Pharmaceuticals and Genentech) is a small molecule RAF dimer (type II) inhibitor which shows anti-tumor clinical activity in cancer patients with BRAFV600E- and NRAS- mutations.
