= Olmutinib =

Chemical compound

Clinical data
- Other names: HM-61713, BI-1482694
- Routes of administration: By mouth
- ATC code: L01EB06 (WHO)

Legal status
- Legal status: Approved in South Korea

Identifiers
- IUPAC name: N-{3-[(2-{[4-(4-Methyl-1-piperazinyl)phenyl]amino}thieno[3,2-d]pyrimidin-4-yl)oxy]phenyl}acrylamide
- CAS Number: 1353550-13-6
- PubChem CID: 54758501
- ChemSpider: 45743494
- UNII: CHL9B67L95
- KEGG: D10859
- CompTox Dashboard (EPA): DTXSID001319119

Chemical and physical data
- Formula: C_{26}H_{26}N_{6}O_{2}S
- Molar mass: 486.59 g·mol^{−1}
- 3D model (JSmol): Interactive image
- SMILES: CN1CCN(CC1)c2ccc(cc2)Nc3nc4ccsc4c(n3)Oc5cccc(c5)NC(=O)C=C
- InChI: InChI=1S/C26H26N6O2S/c1-3-23(33)27-19-5-4-6-21(17-19)34-25-24-22(11-16-35-24)29-26(30-25)28-18-7-9-20(10-8-18)32-14-12-31(2)13-15-32/h3-11,16-17H,1,12-15H2,2H3,(H,27,33)(H,28,29,30); Key:FDMQDKQUTRLUBU-UHFFFAOYSA-N

Olmutinib (INN) is an investigational anti-cancer drug. It acts by covalently bonding to a cysteine residue near the kinase domain of epidermal growth factor receptor (EGFR).

In the US, it was given a breakthrough therapy designation in non-small cell lung cancer (NSCLC) in December 2015, and In South Korea, the drug was approved in May 2016 for the second-line treatment of NSCLC with the T790M mutation of EGFR. Resistance to olmutinib has been reported; a person's cancer started progressing after they developed a C797S mutation in EGFR.

Olmutinib was discovered by Hanmi Pharmaceutical and licensed to Boehringer Ingelheim in 2015 in an agreement with a $50 million up front payment and up $680 million in milestones. In November 2015 Hanmi granted an exclusive license to sell olmutinib in China to the Chinese company ZAI Labs.

On September 30, 2016, Korean regulatory authorities issued a safety alert about olmutinib in which it described two cases of toxic epidermal necrolysis, one of which was fatal, and a case of Stevens–Johnson syndrome; Boeheringer announced the termination its deal with Hanmi the same day, citing that the decision came after a review of "all available clinical data" on the drug, and also referring to competing drugs.
