= CircoFLEX =

CircoFLEX is a veterinary recombinant vaccine for porcine circovirus type 2 (PCV 2). It is manufactured by German pharmaceutical company Boehringer Ingelheim.
