= Mir-432 microRNA precursor family =

mir-432

Identifiers
- Symbol: mir-432
- Rfam: RF00775
- miRBase family: MIPF0000211

Other data
- RNA type: microRNA
- Domain: Eukaryota;
- PDB structures: PDBe

In molecular biology mir-432 microRNA is a short RNA molecule. MicroRNAs function to regulate the expression levels of other genes by several mechanisms.

== See also ==
- MicroRNA
