= Hanmi Pharm =

South Korean pharmaceutical company

Hanmi Pharm Co., Ltd.
- Native name: 한미약품
- Industry: Pharmaceutical
- Founded: 1973; 53 years ago
- Founder: Lim Sung-ki
- Headquarters: Seoul, South Korea
- Website: hanmi.co.kr

- Hanmi Pharm
- Hangul: 한미약품
- Hanja: 韓美藥品
- RR: Hanmi yakpum
- MR: Hanmi yakp'um

Hanmi Pharm Co., Ltd. (Korean: 한미약품) is a South Korean pharmaceutical company that is headquartered in Seoul.

== History ==
=== 1973 to 2009 ===
Hanmi was founded in 1973 by Lim Sung-ki, who was a pharmacist. It was originally named Lim, Sung-ki Pharmaceutical Co., but it was quickly changed to Hanmi Pharmaceutical. The company originally started selling Trimethoprim/sulfamethoxazole powder, and would expand to produce Cephalosporin antibiotics in 1985 and injectable Ceftriaxone antibiotics in 1987. By 1988 the company was listed in the Korea Exchange. Hanmi started selling drugs in China in 1996. In 1994, the company began developing Cyclosporin. The company broke the ₩100,000,000,000 barrier in sales in 1997. The company began moving into the European market in 1998. The company still was developing new drugs, with Paclitaxel in 2000, Itraconazole tablets in 2001, 24-hour controlled-release Nifedipine tablets and a new salt form of Amlodipine in 2004, and an anti-obesity drug using sibutramine mesilate in 2007. Hanmi and Crystal Genomics formed a strategic partnership in 2008.

=== 2010 and beyond ===
By around 2010, Hanmi's R&D had two areas of interest: developing longer-lasting peptide and protein therapeutics using its "Lapscovery" technology, and developing small molecule tyrosine-kinase inhibitors for cancer and autoimmune diseases. Its strategy was to developmental incremental modifications of existing drugs, create new combination drugs, and to develop novel drugs.

In August 2014 Hanmi exclusively licensed rights in China for poziotinib, a small molecule EGFR inhibitor, to the Chinese company Luye Pharma; in February 2015 Hanmi licensed rights in the rest of the world outside of South Korea to Spectrum Pharmaceuticals.

In March 2015 Hanmi and Lilly signed an exclusive license outside of Asia for Hanmi's small molecule Bruton's tyrosine kinase inhibitor in the field of autoimmune diseases; Lilly paid $50 million upfront and the deal included up to $640 million in milestones and royalties greater than 10%.

In November 2015 Hanmi signed three agreements:

- An exclusive license outside of South Korea and China with Sanofi for Hanmi's Glucagon-like peptide-1 receptor agonist drug candidates for diabetes; Sanofi paid $434 million upfront and up to $3.2 billion in milestones and royalties over 10%. The deal included efpeglenatide, a long-acting glucagon-like peptide-1 receptor agonist; an insulin intended to be delivered once per week, and a fixed-dosed weekly GLP1-RA/insulin drug combination.
- An exclusive license outside of South Korea and China with the J&J subsidiary Janssen Pharmaceuticals for Hanmi's oxyntomodulin-analog metabolic disease programs, including HM12525A; J&J paid $105 million upfront and the deal included $810M in milestones and royalties higher than 10%
- An exclusive license in China with the Chinese company ZAI Labs for olmutinib.

In April 2016 Hanmi announced that it had acquired land near Yantai in the Shandong province of China, where it would build a manufacturing plant and R&D facility; at that time it already had a facility in Beijing. In July Hanmi said it intended to invest more heavily in developing candidate substances of promising new drugs at an early stage in new pharmaceutical and biotech related fields, including through a venture capital firm set up by Sung-ki and colleagues.

In May 2016 the Korean regulatory authority approved olmutinib as a second-line treatment for certain kinds of non-small cell lung cancer.

On September 28 Hanmi and Zentec Pharmaceuticals agreed that Zentec would market Hanmi's small molecule cancer drug candidate, HM95573; Zentec paid $80 million upfront, with $830 million in milestones, and royalties.

On September 29, Hanmi and Roche's cancer subsidiary Genentech announced a deal for Hanmi's Phase I cancer drug candidate, HM95573, which targets the MAPK/ERK pathway; Roche agreed to pay $80 million upfront, and the deal included $830 million in milestones.

In December 2016 the Sanofi deal was reduced in scope, with Hanmi receiving back rights to the once-weekly insulin and the combination GLP1-RA/insulin product, and agreeing to repay Sanofi $250 million of the $434 million upfront payment.

On December 3, 2019, Rapt Therapeutics and Hanami Pharmaceutical announced collaboration to develop and commercialize FLX475 in Asia. FLX475 is an oral, small molecule CCR4 antagonist in development for the treatment of multiple cancers.

In August 2020, chairman and founder of Hanmi Pharmaceutical Lim Sung-ki died of a chronic disease. He was 80.

On May 15, 2023, Athenex, which was Hanmi's U.S. partner for its anticancer product, Oraxol, filed for Chapter 11 bankruptcy protection.

== Controversies ==
=== Employee insider trading scandal ===
On the evening of September 29, 2016, Hanmi announced the Roche deal, causing its stock to rise; Hanmi was notified by Boehringer that evening that Boehringer was terminating their deal, and the company announced the termination on the morning of the 30th, causing its stock to crash. Hanmi's offices were raided by Korean regulatory authorities in mid-October based on evidence that insider knowledge of the Boehringer termination was passed to third parties, who shorted the stock prior to the announcement on the 30th. In December three Hanmi employees were among 17 people indicted for insider trading; 25 people were fined, and 45 people were found to have made illegal trades that took around 3.3 billion won ($2.83 million) in profits based on the information.

=== Olmutinib safety concerns ===
On September 30, 2016, Korean regulatory authorities issued a safety alert about olmutinib in which it described two cases of toxic epidermal necrolysis, one of which was fatal, and a case of Stevens–Johnson syndrome; Boeheringer announced the termination its deal with Hanmi the same day, citing that the decision came after a review of "all available clinical data" on the drug, and also referring to competing drugs.

In April 2018 Hanmi was found to have violated two laws in Korea by not disclosing adverse effects of olmutinib sooner. In that month Zai said it was dropping olmutinib and a few days later Hanmi said it was terminating development of the drug.

== See also ==
- List of pharmaceutical companies
- Manufacturing in South Korea
