= Pharmacosmos =

Danish pharmaceutical company

Pharmacosmos A/S
- Company type: Private
- Industry: Pharmaceuticals, Healthcare
- Founded: 1965
- Headquarters: Holbaek, Denmark
- Key people: Tobias S. Christensen (President and CEO), Jacob Tolstrup (Chairman of the Board)
- Products: Monofer, Cosmofer, Uniferon, Pharmacosmos Dextrans
- Number of employees: 500 (2020)
- Website: www.pharmacosmos.com

Pharmacosmos is a pharmaceutical company specialized in treatment of iron deficiency anemia.

== Company profile ==
Pharmacosmos was founded in Denmark in 1965 by Henry Marinus Christensen, M.D., Ph.D.

=== Operations ===
Pharmacosmos' corporate headquarters, manufacturing facilities and research laboratories are located in Holbaek, Denmark (Scandinavia). The company has its own marketing, sales and services operations in Denmark and US, UK, Ireland, Germany, Sweden, Norway and China. In other geographies, the company partners with other pharmaceutical companies responsible for local marketing, sales and distribution of its pharmaceuticals brands. The company does not disclose its revenues.

=== Manufacturing facilities ===
Pharmacosmos' manufacturing facility is approved according to current Good Manufacturing Practice (GMP) by the European Medicines Agency (EMA) and by the U.S. Food and Drug Administration (FDA).

=== Research and development ===
The company has an ongoing clinical development program aimed at improving treatment options for patients with iron deficiency anemia. In 2010, Pharmacosmos' clinical program included three international clinical studies focused on treatment of iron deficiency anemic patients within nephrology, gastroenterology and hematology/oncology.

== Products ==
=== Monofer ===
Monofer is a treatment for iron deficiency anemia. The generic name of Monofer is iron isomaltoside 1000, developed by Pharmacosmos. Monofer was approved in December 2009, in 22 European countries for treatment of iron deficiency anemia in patients with varying underlying conditions. Monofer is approved with a wide dose range and no test dose requirement, allowing iron repletion in a single IV dose if a Total Dose Infusion is given in certain clinical situations. This has to be given in a hospital due to increased risks of reaction. If the patient requires a dose over 20 mg/kg of idealised body weight a second dose has to be given after waiting a week.

=== Cosmofer ===
Cosmofer is a treatment for iron deficiency anemia. The generic name of Cosmofer is low molecular weight iron dextran. Cosmofer was approved in 2001, and is available in more than 45 countries worldwide. It has a lower incidence of dextran-induced analphylaxis than older dextran-based products, although still requires a test dose.

=== Uniferon ===
Uniferon is for the treatment and prevention of iron deficiency anemia in animals. The generic name for Uniferon is iron dextran. Its approved by health authorities in Europe, Asia and in the U.S. by Food and Drug Administration (FDA).

=== Dextrans ===
Pharmacosmos is one of the world leaders within production and fractionation of carbohydrates in particular Dextran. Pharmacosmos has a unique water-based technology and production platform for polymer fractioning and derivative synthesis.

== See also ==
- List of Danish companies
- List of pharmaceutical companies
