= John V. Heymach =

Dr. Heymach in his laboratory.

John V. Heymach is an American medical oncologist, physician–scientist, and academic. He serves as Chair of the Department of Thoracic/Head and Neck Medical Oncology at the University of Texas MD Anderson Cancer Center in Houston, Texas. He is known for his research on targeted therapies, mechanisms of therapeutic resistance, angiogenesis, and biomarker development in lung cancer, including KRAS‑mutant and EGFR‑mutant non–small cell lung cancer (NSCLC) and small cell lung cancer (SCLC). Heymach has an h-index of 144 and over 400 academic publications.

== Early life and education ==
Heymach received his undergraduate degree from Harvard University. He went on to earn his MD and PhD degrees from Stanford University School of Medicine. He completed his internship and residency in internal medicine at Brigham and Women’s Hospital in Boston, followed by a medical oncology fellowship in the Dana‑Farber/Mass General Brigham program (also described as Dana‑Farber/Partners HealthCare).

== Career ==
After completing his fellowship, Heymach joined the faculty of The University of Texas MD Anderson Cancer Center, and later became chair of the Department of Thoracic/Head and Neck Medical Oncology. He holds the David Bruton (also cited as David Bruton Jr.) Endowed Chair in Cancer Research at MD Anderson.

At MD Anderson, he has led the thoracic oncology program and is described as chief of the lung cancer and thoracic group, focusing on the development of new treatment approaches for lung cancer. He is a co‑leader of MD Anderson’s Lung Cancer Moon Shot program. He serves as principal investigator (PI) or co‑PI on multiple lung cancer research programs funded by the National Cancer Institute (NCI), LUNGevity, the American Association for Cancer Research (AACR), and Stand Up To Cancer (SU2C).

Heymach leads or co‑leads several biomarker‑driven clinical trials of targeted therapies and immunotherapies in lung cancer. He also serves as leader of the Lung Cancer CCSG (Cancer Center Support Grant) Program and co‑PI and project leader of the Lung SPORE (Specialized Program of Research Excellence). In addition, he has served as MD Anderson’s PI for the SU2C–American Cancer Society Lung Cancer “Dream Team” focusing on KRAS‑mutant lung cancers.

== Research ==
Heymach's laboratory work centers on understanding molecular drivers of lung cancer, mechanisms of therapeutic resistance to targeted and anti‑angiogenic agents, and the development of predictive biomarkers for targeted therapies and immunotherapies. His group uses integrative genomic and proteomic analyses of human samples, combined with cell line and mouse models, to guide “bench‑to‑bedside” translational research.

His specific areas of focus include mechanisms of resistance and new therapeutic strategies in EGFR‑mutant NSCLC, including approaches for exon 18 and exon 20 EGFR and HER2 mutations, epithelial–mesenchymal transition, and drug‑tolerant persister cells; identification of genomic determinants of response to immunotherapy and novel treatment approaches for KRAS‑mutant NSCLC; development of new therapeutic targets and immunotherapy strategies for SCLC; study of blood‑based biomarkers and mechanisms of resistance to angiogenesis inhibitors in lung cancer.

Discoveries of the lab have included new therapeutic targets for SCLC; the identification of biomarkers and mechanisms of resistance to VEGF and EGFR inhibitors; and the recognition that KRAS‑mutant lung cancers can be subdivided into biologically distinct subgroups with differing responses to immunotherapy and other treatments.

As a clinical investigator, Heymach has led numerous biomarker‑directed clinical trials evaluating targeted agents and immunotherapies in multiple lung cancer subsets, some of which have contributed to regimens that are now considered standard of care or are under active clinical evaluation.

== Roles and affiliations ==
Heymach holds or has held leadership and advisory roles in national and international cancer research organizations. He is a member of the American Association for Cancer Research and has served on AACR‑related initiatives, including work associated with lung cancer innovation awards. He has also served as chair of the National Cancer Institute’s Molecular Cancer Therapeutics‑1 (MCT‑1) study section, which reviews grants related to experimental cancer therapeutics.

He also serves on scientific advisory boards for biotechnology and pharmaceutical companies, including ModeX Therapeutics, where he is listed as a member of the Scientific Advisory Board.

== Mentorship and teaching ==
Heymach mentors physician‑scientists and fellows in medical oncology and transnational cancer research. He has supervised trainees in laboratory and clinical research and has been involved in graduate and postgraduate education through MD Anderson’s programs and associated graduate schools.

== Selected publications ==
- Patel SA, Nilsson MB, Le X, Cascone T, Jain RK, Heymach JV. Molecular Mechanisms and Future Implications of VEGF/VEGFR in Cancer Therapy. Clin Cancer Res 29(1):30-39, 2023. e-Pub 2022. PMID 35969170.
- Khan TM, Verbus EA, Gandhi S, Heymach JV, Hernandez JM, Elamin YY. Osimertinib, Surgery, and Radiation Therapy in Treating Patients with Stage IIIB or IV Non-Small Cell Lung Cancer with EGFR Mutations (NORTHSTAR). Ann Surg Oncol 29(8):4688-4689, 2022. e-Pub 2022. PMID 35527328.
- Le X, Negrao MV, Reuben A, Federico L, Diao L, McGrail D, Nilsson M, Robichaux J, Munoz IG, Patel S, Elamin Y, Fan YH, Lee WC, Parra E, Solis Soto LM, Chen R, Li J, Karpinets T, Khairullah R, Kadara H, Behrens C, Sepesi B, Wang R, Zhu M, Wang L, Vaporciyan A, Roth J, Swisher S, Haymaker C, Zhang J, Wang J, Wong KK, Byers LA, Bernatchez C, Zhang J, Wistuba II, Gibbons DL, Akbay EA, Heymach JV. Characterization of the immune landscape of EGFR-mutant NSCLC identifies the CD73/adenosine pathway as a potential therapeutic target. J Thorac Oncol 16(4):583-600, 2021. e-Pub 2020. PMID 33388477.
- Lam VK, Zhang J, Wu CC, Tran HT, Li L, Diao L, Wang J, Rinsurongkawong W, Raymond VM, Lanman RB, Lewis J, Roarty EB, Roth J, Swisher S, Lee JJ, Gibbons DL, Papadimitrakopoulou VA, Heymach JV. Genotype-specific differences in circulating tumor DNA levels in advanced NSCLC. J Thorac Oncol 16(4):601-609, 2021. e-Pub 2020. PMID 33388476.
- Nilsson MB, Robichaux J, Herynk MH, Cascone T, Le X, Elamin Y, Patel S, Zhang F, Xu L, Hu L, Diao L, Shen L, He J, Yu X, Nikolinakos P, Saintigny P, Fang B, Girard L, Wang J, Minna JD, Wistuba II, Heymach JV. Altered regulation of HIF-1α in naïve- and drug-resistant EGFR mutant NSCLC: implications for a VEGF-dependent phenotype. J Thorac Oncol 16(3):439-451, 2021. e-Pub 2020. PMID 33309987.
