= Genetics of GnRH deficiency conditions =

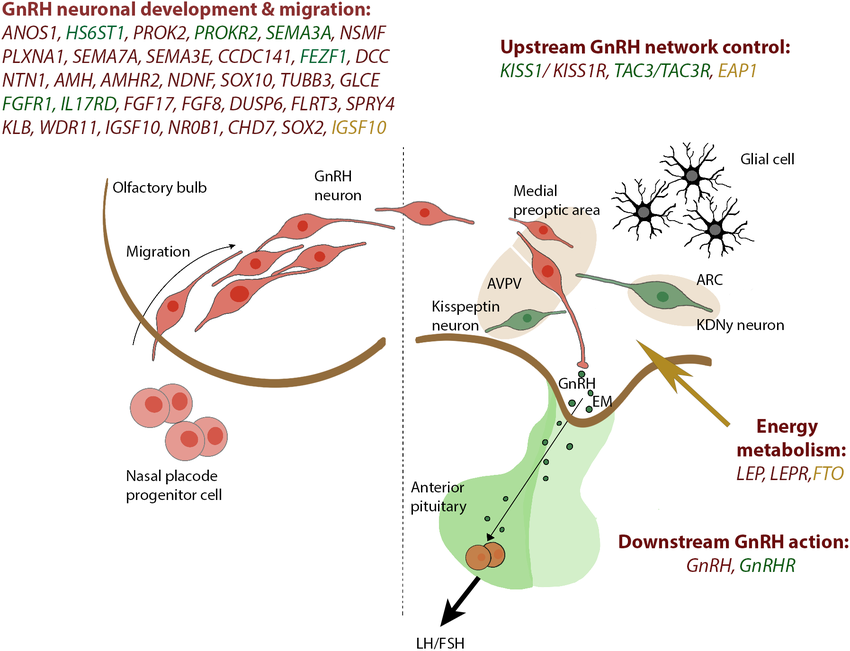
The genetic and molecular basis of idiopathic hypogonadotropic hypogonadism and self-limiting puberty delay

To date, at least 25 different genes have been implicated in causing gonadotropin-releasing hormone (GnRH) deficiency conditions such as Kallmann syndrome (KS) or other forms of congenital hypogonadotropic hypogonadism (CHH) through a disruption in the production or activity of GnRH. These genes involved cover all forms of inheritance, and no one gene defect has been shown to be common to all cases, which makes genetic testing and inheritance prediction difficult.

The number of genes known to cause cases of KS/CHH is still increasing. In addition, it is thought that some cases of KS/CHH are caused by two separate gene defects occurring at the same time.

== Genes ==
A table of known genes responsible for cases of GnRH deficiency conditions is shown below. Listed are the estimated prevalence of cases caused by the specific gene, additional associated symptoms and the form of inheritance. Between 35 and 45% of cases of KS/CHH have an unknown genetic cause.

Prevalence (%)	OMIM	Name	Gene	Locus	Clinical features	Syndromes associated	Inheritance pattern
5, 5-10	308700	HH1 (KAL1)	ANOS1	Xp22.3	Anosmia. Bimanual synkinesis. Renal agenesis.		x-linked
10	147950	HH2 (KAL2)	FGFR1	8p11.23	Cleft lip and / or cleft palate. Septo-optic dysplasia. Skeletal anomomalies. Bimanual synkinesis. Hand / foot malformations such as ectrodactyly. Combined pituitary hormone deficiency.	Hartsfield syndrome	Autosomal dominant
6-16, 5-10	146110	HH7	GNRHR	4q13.2			Autosomal recessive
6, 5-10	612370	HH5	CHD7	8q12.2	Congenital hearing loss. Semicircular canal hypoplasia.	CHARGE syndrome	Autosomal dominant
3-6, <2	610628	HH4	PROK2	3p13			Autosomal recessive
3-6, 5	244200	HH3	PROKR2	20p12.3	Combined pituitary hormone deficiency.	Morning Glory syndrome	Autosomal recessive
3, 2-5	615267	HH18	IL17RD	3p14.3	Congenital hearing loss.		Autosomal recessive
2, 2-5	611584	WS2E	SOX10	22q13.1	Congenital hearing loss.	Waardenburg syndrome	Autosomal dominant
2, <2	614842	HH13	KiSS-1	1q32.1			Autosomal recessive
2, <2	614837	HH8	KISS1R	19p13.3			Autosomal recessive
<2	612702	HH6	FGF8	10q24.32	Cleft lip and / or cleft palate. Skeletal anomomolies. Bimanual synkinesis. Combined pituitary hormone deficiency.		Autosomal dominant
<2, 1 report	615270	HH20	FGF17	8p21.3		Dandy–Walker syndrome	Autosomal dominant
<2	614962	LEPD	LEP	7q32.1	Early onset of morbid obesity.		Autosomal recessive
<2	601007	LEPRD	LEPR	1p31.3	Early onset of morbid obesity.		Autosomal recessive
<2	600955	PCSK1D	PCSK1	5q15	Early onset of morbid obesity.		Autosomal recessive
Rare, 1 report	616030	HH22	FEZF1	7q31.32			Autosomal recessive
Rare, 2 reports	616031	N/A	CCDC141	2q31.2			Unknown
Rare, <2	614897	HH16	SEMA3A	7q21.11			Autosomal dominant
1 report	608166	N/A	SEMA3E	7q21.11		CHARGE syndrome	Autosomal dominant
Rare	607961	N/A	SEMA7A	15q24.1			Autosomal dominant
Rare, <2	614880	HH15	HS6ST1	2q14.3	Cleft lip and / or cleft palate. Skeletal anomalies.		Autosomal dominant
Rare, 1 report	614858	HH14	WDR11	10q26.12	Combined pituitary hormone deficiency.		Autosomal dominant
Rare	614838	HH9	NSMF	9q34.3			Autosomal dominant
Rare	617351	N/A	IGSF10	3q24	Delayed puberty		Autosomal dominant
Rare, <2	614841	HH12	GNRH1	8p21.2			Autosomal recessive
Rare, <2	614839	HH10	TAC3	12q3			Autosomal recessive
Rare, 5	614840	HH11	TACR3	4q24			Autosomal recessive
Rare	611744	N/A	OTUD4	4q31.21	Cerebellar ataxia.	Gordon Holmes syndrome (unconfirmed)	Autosomal recessive
Rare	609948	GDH5	RNF216	7p22.1	Cerebellar ataxia.	Gordon Holmes syndrome	Autosomal recessive
Rare	215470	BNHS	PNPLA6	19p13.2	Cerebellar ataxia.	Boucher-Neuhauser syndrome	Autosomal recessive
1 report	109135	N/A	AXL	19q13.2			Unknown
Rare	616113	PEPNS	DMXL2	15q21.2	Polyendocrine deficiencies and polyneuropathy.		Autosomal recessive
Rare	300200	AHC	NR0B1 (DAX1)	Xp21.2	Adrenal hypoplasia.		x-linked
1 report	602748	HH19	DUSP6	12q21.33			Autosomal dominant
1 report	614381	HLD8	POLR3B	12q23.3		POLR3-related leukodystrophy	Autosomal recessive
1 report	615266	HH17	SPRY4	5q31.3			Autosomal dominant
1 report	615271	HH21	FLRT3	20p12.1			Autosomal dominant
1 report	617264	N/A	SRA1	19q13.33			Unknown
Rare	182230	CPHD5	HESX1	3p14.3	Septo-optic dysplasia. Combined pituitary hormone deficiency.		Autosomal recessive and dominant

== See also ==
- Kallmann syndrome
- Hypogonadotropic hypogonadism
- GnRH
- Isolated hypogonadotropic hypogonadism
