= Isolated hypogonadotropic hypogonadism =

- Other names: Normosmic idiopathic hypogonadotropic hypogonadism

Isolated hypogonadotropic hypogonadism (IHH), also called idiopathic or congenital hypogonadotropic hypogonadism (CHH), as well as isolated or congenital gonadotropin-releasing hormone deficiency (IGD), is a condition which results in a small subset of cases of hypogonadotropic hypogonadism (HH) due to deficiency in or insensitivity to gonadotropin-releasing hormone (GnRH) where the function and anatomy of the anterior pituitary is otherwise normal and secondary causes of HH are not present.

== Presentation ==
Congenital hypogonadotropic hypogonadism presents as hypogonadism, e.g., reduced or absent puberty, low libido and infertility, due to an impaired release of the gonadotropins, follicle-stimulating hormone (FSH) and luteinizing hormone (LH), and a resultant lack of sex steroid and peptides production by the gonads.

In Kallmann syndrome, a variable non-reproductive phenotype occurs with anosmia (loss of the sense of smell) including sensorineural deafness, coloboma, bimanual synkinesis, craniofacial abnormalities, and/or renal agenesis.

== Causes ==
IHH is divided into two syndromes: IHH with olfactory alterations or anosmia, Kallmann syndrome and IHH with normal smell (normosmic IHH).

Kallmann syndrome is responsible for approximately 50% of all cases of the condition. It is associated with mutations in KAL1, FGFR1/FGF8, FGF17, IL17RD, PROKR2, NELF, CHD7 (which positively regulates GnRH secretion), HS6ST1, FLRT3, SPRY4, DUSP6, SEMA3A, and WDR11 (gene), genes which are related to defects in neuronal migration.

Gene defects associated with IHH and normal smell include PROKR2, FGFR1, FGF8, CHD7, DUSP6, and WDR11, as in KS, but in addition mutations in KISS1R, TACR3, GNRH1/GNRHR, LEP/LEPR, HESX1, FSHB, and LHB. GnRH insensitivity is the second most common cause of IHH, responsible for up to 20% of cases. A minority of less than 5–10% is due to inactivating mutations in genes which positively regulate GnRH secretion such as CHD7, KISS1R, and TACR3.

The causes of about 25% of all IHH cases are still unknown.

== See also ==
- Hypogonadotropic hypogonadism
- Hypergonadotropic hypogonadism
- Kallmann syndrome
- Genetics of GnRH deficiency conditions
- HPG axis
- Gonads (testicles and ovaries)
- GnRH and gonadotropins (FSH and LH)
- Sex hormones (androgens and estrogens)
- Fertile eunuch syndrome
