= HH14 =

HH14, HH-14, HH 14, HH.14, may refer to:

- Uncompromising Honor (novel), abbreviated "HH14", 14th main-line novel in the Honor Harrington novel series, part of the Honorverse fictional milieu created by David Weber
- HH14, one of the Hamburger–Hamilton stages in chick development
- WD repeat-containing protein 11 (HH14)

== See also ==
- HH (disambiguation)
- H14 (disambiguation)
- H (disambiguation)
