= POLR3A =

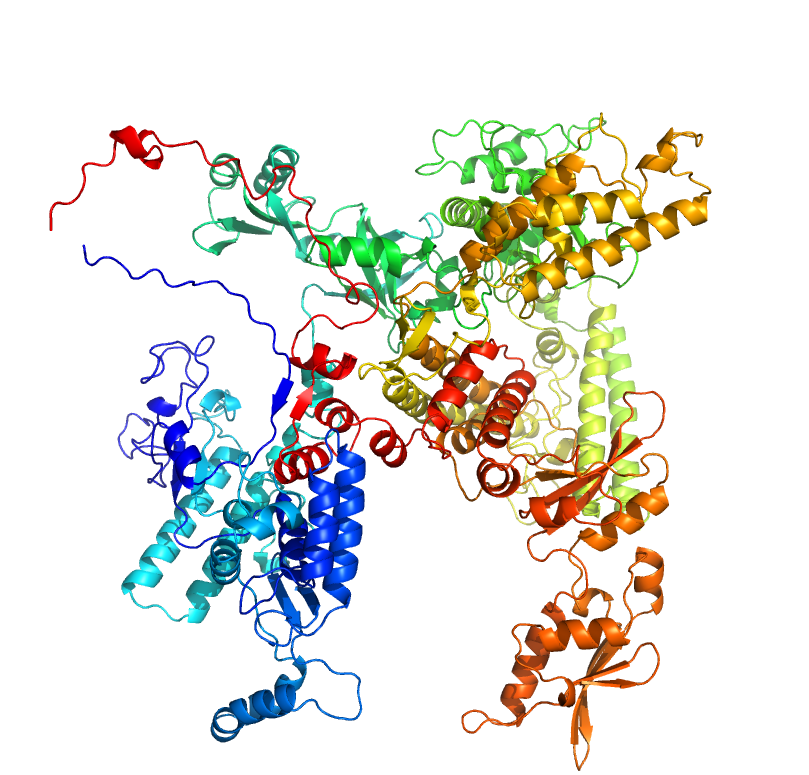

Identifiers
- Aliases: POLR3A, ADDH, HLD7, RPC1, RPC155, hRPC155, polymerase (RNA) III subunit A, RNA polymerase III subunit A, WDRTS, C160
- External IDs: OMIM: 614258; MGI: 2681836; GeneCards: POLR3A
Enzyme activity
EC #	BRENDA	ExPASy	KEGG	MetaCyc
2.7.7.6	↗	↗	↗	↗

Gene location (Human)
Chr.	Chromosome 10 (human)
Band	10q22.3	Start	77,975,149 bp
Band	10q22.3	End	78,029,515 bp

Gene location (Mouse)
Chr.	Chromosome 14 (mouse)
Band	14|14 A3	Start	24,498,764 bp
Band	14|14 A3	End	24,537,126 bp
RNA expression pattern
Bgee	Human / Mouse (ortholog); Top expressed in: buccal mucosa cell; middle temporal gyrus; secondary oocyte; tibialis anterior muscle; Brodmann area 23; endothelial cell; skin of arm; superior frontal gyrus; postcentral gyrus; testicle / Top expressed in: primary oocyte; Rostral migratory stream; internal carotid artery; external carotid artery; motor neuron; Paneth cell; zygote; substantia nigra; secondary oocyte; tail of embryo; More reference expression data
BioGPS	n/a
Gene ontology
Molecular function	transferase activity; DNA binding; nucleotidyltransferase activity; chromatin binding; metal ion binding; RNA polymerase III activity; DNA-directed 5'-3' RNA polymerase activity
Cellular component	cytosol; membrane; nucleoplasm; RNA polymerase III complex; nucleus
Biological process	positive regulation of protein targeting to mitochondrion; immune system process; transcription, DNA-templated; regulation of autophagy of mitochondrion; defense response to virus; positive regulation of type I interferon production; positive regulation of interferon-beta production; transcription by RNA polymerase III; innate immune response
Sources:Amigo / QuickGO
Orthologs
Databases	NCBI: entry; OMA: entry
Species	Human	Mouse
Entrez	11128	218832
Ensembl	ENSG00000148606	ENSMUSG00000025280
UniProt	O14802	B2RXC6
RefSeq (mRNA)	NM_007055	NM_001081247; NM_183157
RefSeq (protein)	NP_008986	NP_001074716
Location (UCSC)	Chr 10: 77.98 – 78.03 Mb	Chr 14: 24.5 – 24.54 Mb
PubMed search
- Wikidata
View/Edit Human	View/Edit Mouse

RNA polymerase III subunit A is an enzyme which is encoded by the gene POLR3A.

== Gene ==
The POLR3A gene is located on the long arm (q) of chromosome 10 on position 22.3, from base pair from base pair 77,975,149 to base pair 78,029,515.

== Function ==
RNA polymerase III subunit A (this gene) along with subunit B (POLR3B) forms the catalytic core of RNA polymerase III. Together, these two subunits create the active center of the enzyme where RNA synthesis occurs.

RNA polymerase III subunit A also detects foreign DNA and triggers an innate immune response.

== Clinical significance ==
=== Wiedemann–Rautenstrauch syndrome ===
Wiedemann–Rautenstrauch syndrome is a rare genetic disorder, which is characterised by prenatal and postnatal growth restriction, lipodystrophy, sparse hair, relatively large head, and a peculiar face. Intellectual disability is also common.

=== 4H leukodystrophy ===
4H leukodystrophy is a rare genetic disorder, which is characterised by hypogonadotropic hypogonadism, dental abnormalities, and hypomyelination.
