= Bromodomain and WD repeat-containing protein 1 =

Protein-coding gene in humans

BRWD1

Identifiers
- Aliases: BRWD1, C21orf107, N143, WDR9, DCAF19, bromodomain and WD repeat domain containing 1, WRD9
- External IDs: OMIM: 617824; MGI: 1890651; GeneCards: BRWD1
Available structures
PDB	Ortholog search: PDBe RCSB
PDB	List of PDB id codes 3Q2E

Gene location (Human)
Chr.	Chromosome 21 (human)
Band	21q22.2	Start	39,184,176 bp
Band	21q22.2	End	39,321,559 bp

Gene location (Mouse)
Chr.	Chromosome 16 (mouse)
Band	16|16 C4	Start	95,793,292 bp
Band	16|16 C4	End	95,883,726 bp
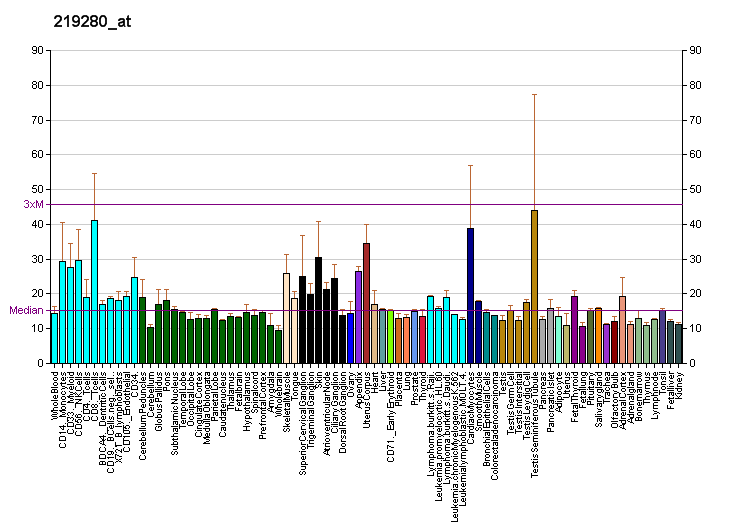

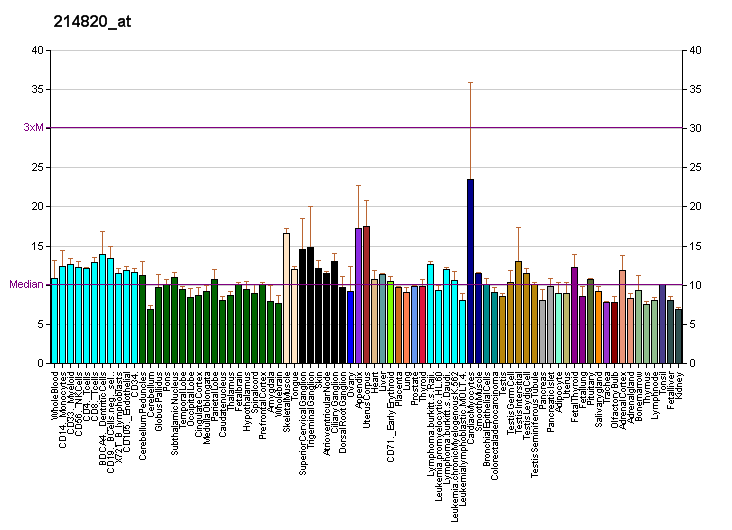
RNA expression pattern
Bgee	Human / Mouse (ortholog); Top expressed in: sural nerve; Achilles tendon; middle temporal gyrus; Brodmann area 23; secondary oocyte; nucleus accumbens; testicle; epithelium of colon; prefrontal cortex; ganglionic eminence / Top expressed in: zygote; ascending aorta; aortic valve; medial ganglionic eminence; spermatid; neural layer of retina; ventricular zone; spermatocyte; secondary oocyte; tail of embryo; More reference expression data
BioGPS	More reference expression data
Gene ontology
Molecular function	molecular function
Cellular component	nucleolus; nucleus; nucleoplasm; cytoplasm; cytosol
Biological process	regulation of transcription by RNA polymerase II; regulation of transcription, DNA-templated; cytoskeleton organization; transcription, DNA-templated; regulation of cell shape; chromatin organization; interleukin-7-mediated signaling pathway
Sources:Amigo / QuickGO
Orthologs
Databases	NCBI: entry; OMA: entry
Species	Human	Mouse
Entrez	54014	93871
Ensembl	ENSG00000185658	ENSMUSG00000022914
UniProt	Q9NSI6	Q921C3
RefSeq (mRNA)	NM_001007246; NM_018963; NM_033656	NM_001103179; NM_145125; NM_176928
RefSeq (protein)	NP_001007247; NP_061836; NP_387505	NP_001096649; NP_660107; NP_795902
Location (UCSC)	Chr 21: 39.18 – 39.32 Mb	Chr 16: 95.79 – 95.88 Mb
PubMed search
- Wikidata
View/Edit Human	View/Edit Mouse

Bromodomain and WD repeat-containing protein 1 (BRWD1) also known as WD repeat-containing protein 9 (WDR9) is a protein that in humans is encoded by the BRWD1 gene.

== Function ==
This gene encodes a member of the WD repeat protein family. WD repeats are minimally conserved regions of approximately 40 amino acids typically bracketed by Gly-His and Trp-Asp (GH-WD), which may facilitate formation of heterotrimeric or multiprotein complexes. Members of this family are involved in a variety of cellular processes, including cell cycle progression, signal transduction, apoptosis, and gene regulation. This protein contains 2 bromodomains and 8 WD repeats, and the function of this protein is not known. This gene is located within the Down syndrome region-2 on chromosome 21. Alternative splicing of this gene generates 3 transcript variants diverging at the 3' ends.

== See also ==
- BRWD3
- WDR11, also known as BRWD2
