= POLR3-related leukodystrophy =

- Other names: Hypomyelination, hypodontia, hypogonadotropic hypogonadism (4H leukodystrophy/syndrome); Ataxia, delayed dentition, and hypomyelination (ADDH); Tremor-ataxia with central hypomyelination (TACH); Leukodystrophy with oligodontia (LO); Hypomyelination with cerebellar atrophy and hypoplasia of the corpus callosum (HCAHC)
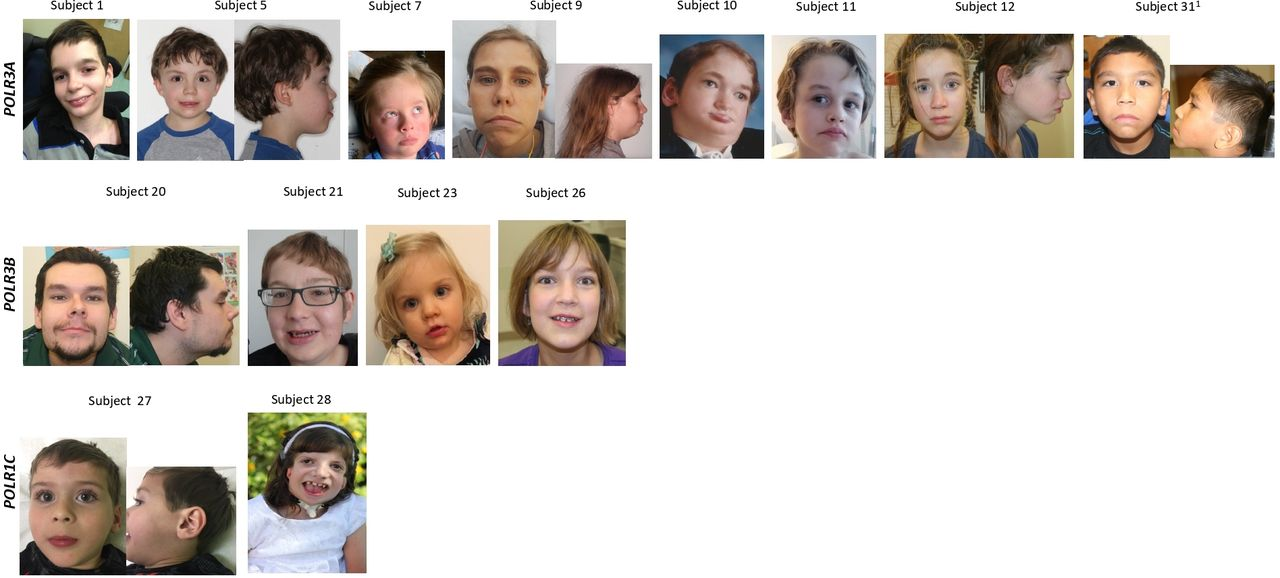
- This illustration shows patients with POLR3-HLD, who have typical features of that disease (except for subject 28, who also has Treacher-Collins syndrome), such as: flat midface, smooth philtrum, and pointed chin.
- Specialty: Neurology, Endocrinology, Ophthalmology
- Causes: Biallelic mutation in POLR3A, POLR3B, POLR3K, POLR3D, POLR1C.
- Treatment: Symptomatic
- Prognosis: With POLR3A mutation, the prognosis is worse than in patients with POLR3B mutations.

POLR3-related leukodystrophy (also known as 4H leukodystrophy) is a rare hereditary disorder which is caused by mutations in RNA polymerase III subunit genes, such as POLR3A, POLR3B, POLR3K, POLR3D, POLR1C. Patients with POLR3-related leukodystrophy usually experience cognitive deficits, with or without endocrine problems (such as short stature, hypogonadotropic hypogonadism, a condition where testes and ovaries do not produce enough sex hormones due to a problem with the pituitary gland or hypothalamus), dental anomalies (such as hypodontia, and delayed dentition), or nearsightedness. This disease usually begins early childhood, although there are late-onset cases.

POLR3-related leukodystrophy is inherited in autosomal recessive fashion. There are 321 reported cases of POLR3-related leukodystrophy.

== Symptoms ==
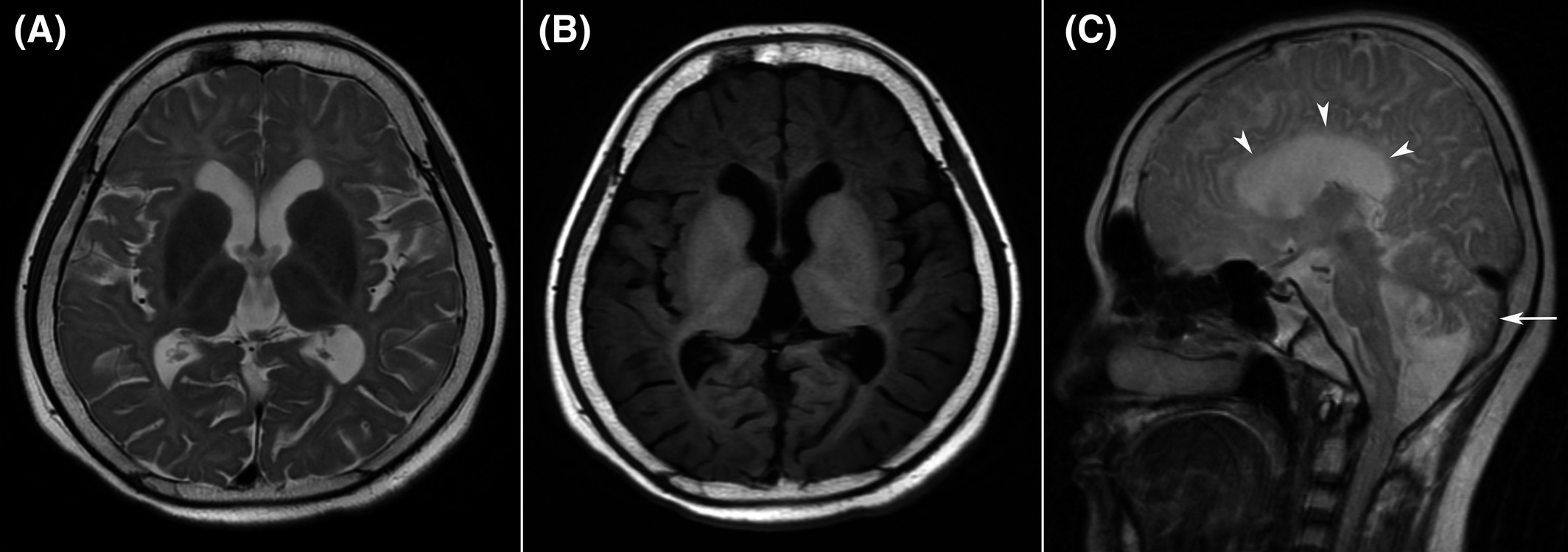
MRI of the brain of the patient with POLR3-HLD. Extensive signal abnormalities of the whole white matter appearing hyperintense on T2 axial-weighted image (A) and hypointense on T1 axial-weighted image (B), which indicates hypomyelination, volume of basal ganglia is normal. On figure C, T2-weighted midline sagittal image showed corpus callosum hypoplasia (arrowheads) and cerebellar atrophy (arrow).

Patients most commonly experience problems with dentition, ataxia, hypomyelination (lack of myelin deposition), dystonia, dysarthric speech, hypodontia (the absence of one to six teeth), hypogonadotropic hypogonadism, and myopia (approx. 50% of cases). Frequently patients experience extra- and/or pyramidal, and cerebellar symptoms, such as: paralysis, dystonia, nystagmus, and ataxia. Also, delayed puberty, drooling, poor swallowing, and short stature can be seen frequently. Occasionally patients experience impaired saccades (fast movement of the eye), abnormal thyroid function, reduced response to growth hormone stimulation test, delayed eruption of teeth, dysdiadochokinesia (an inability to perform quick alternating movements) dysmetria (lack of coordination of movement), underdeveloped corpus callosum, cognitive decline, epilepsy. Rarely patients experience cataracts, optic nerve degeneration, and an abnormally bright T2 signal (T2 signal arises from water and fat compounds) from the striatum can be detected on brain magnetic resonance imaging.

Brain MRIs of patients usually show diffusive hypomyelination with atrophy of cerebellum, a relative T2 hyperintensity of ventral lateral nucleus, and myelination of occipital part of the internal capsule, optic radiation, and the dentate nuclei.

Facial features might include a smooth philtrum, a flat midface, and a pointy chin. Patients with POLR3B mutation usually have a thin upper lip, and in patients with POLR1C a bitemporal narrowing can be seen. One patient with POLR1C mutation got diagnosed with POLR3-related leukodystrophy and Treacher-Collins syndrome.

== Diagnosis ==
Diagnosis of POLR3-Related Leukodystrophy can be made by its classical symptoms and brain MRI and pathogenic biallelic variants in RNA polymerase III subunits genes (such as POLR3A).

== Cause ==
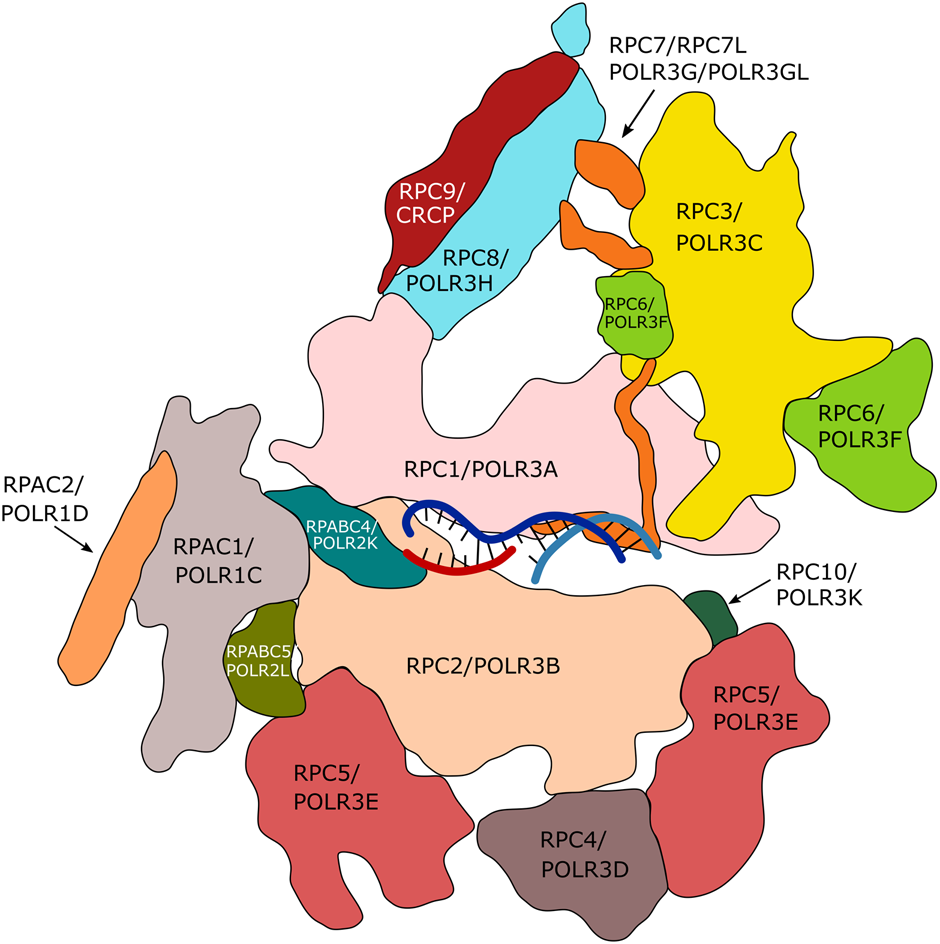
This illustration shows RNA polymerase III complex. POLR3A, POLR3B, POLR3K, POLR3D, and POLR1C are implicated in this disorder

POLR3-Related Leukodystrophy is caused by a biallelic mutations in RNA polymerase III subunits, such as: POLR3A, POLR3B, POLR3D, POLR3K, POLR1C. Much more severe mutation in POLR3A and POLR3B can cause Wiedemann-Rautenstrauch syndrome, and POLR1C mutations can also cause Treacher-Collins syndrome. Patients with heterozygous might also experience Charcot-Marie-Tooth disease type 1I, who develop symptoms in the first years of life with gait abnormalities, hyporeflexia, sensory ataxia, spasticity, and distal sensory problems due to sensorimotor neuropathy that usually affects lower limbs. Also patients with POLR3B variant can develop isolated hypogonadism.

== Pathophysiology ==
RNA polymerase III transcribes non-coding RNAs (RNA that don't encode any proteins) such as 5S ribosomal RNA, tRNA genes (transfer RNAs are RNAs that transport amino acids to mRNA by matching sequences, adding amino acids to a growing peptide), U6 small nuclear RNA, selenocysteine tRNA gene, 7SL RNA gene, vault RNA genes, and BC200 RNA gene. tRNA genes might participate in MBP (Myelin Basic Protein is a protein that participates in building myelin sheath, which is necessary for nerve conduction) translation and 7SL RNA might participate in transfer of mRNA of transmembrane or secreted proteins to endoplasmic reticulum, and in this disease this mechanism might be hampered and cause hypomyelination.

Decreased levels of BC200 RNA might cause dysregulated post-synaptic translation (by preventing assembly of 48S ribosomal complex), which might contribute to cerebellar symptoms (and in rare cases striatum), and dysregulated synthesis of MBP, which also can contribute to hypomyelination. RNA polymerase III mutations can decrease levels of ARX gene, which in turn decreases GABAergic synapses, and causes increased neuronal network activity, which might cause seizures in patients. Hypogonadism might be caused by aberrant small RNA synthesis, resulting in defective transcription of key mediators important for the function of the GnRH receptor protein or for gonadotropin synthesis.

Due to decreased amount of RNA polymerase III might decrease level of RMRP, which in turn might cause hypodontia (RMRP participates in dentition).

== Treatment ==
This disease doesn't have a cure. Management is multidisciplinary and should be tailored to each patient, monitoring by endocrinologist might be necessary for endocrine problems, and ophthalmologist monitoring for myopia. Physical aids and therapy might be necessary for motor function support, and good dental hygiene is necessary to prevent teeth loss.

== History ==
This disorder was first described by Atrouni and colleagues in a consanguineous Syrian family in 2003, and name 4H leukodystrophy was coined in 2006 by Timmons and colleagues. The first gene (POLR3A) to cause that disorder was discovered by Bernard and colleagues in 2011 (In 2010, Bernard and colleagues mapped this disorder to 10q22.3-10q23.31 region). This disorder had five names previously, which later were united under the name "POLR3-related leukodystrophy" after finding the molecular basis of these disorders.
