= Franz Josef Kallmann =

German-American psychiatrist (1897–1965)

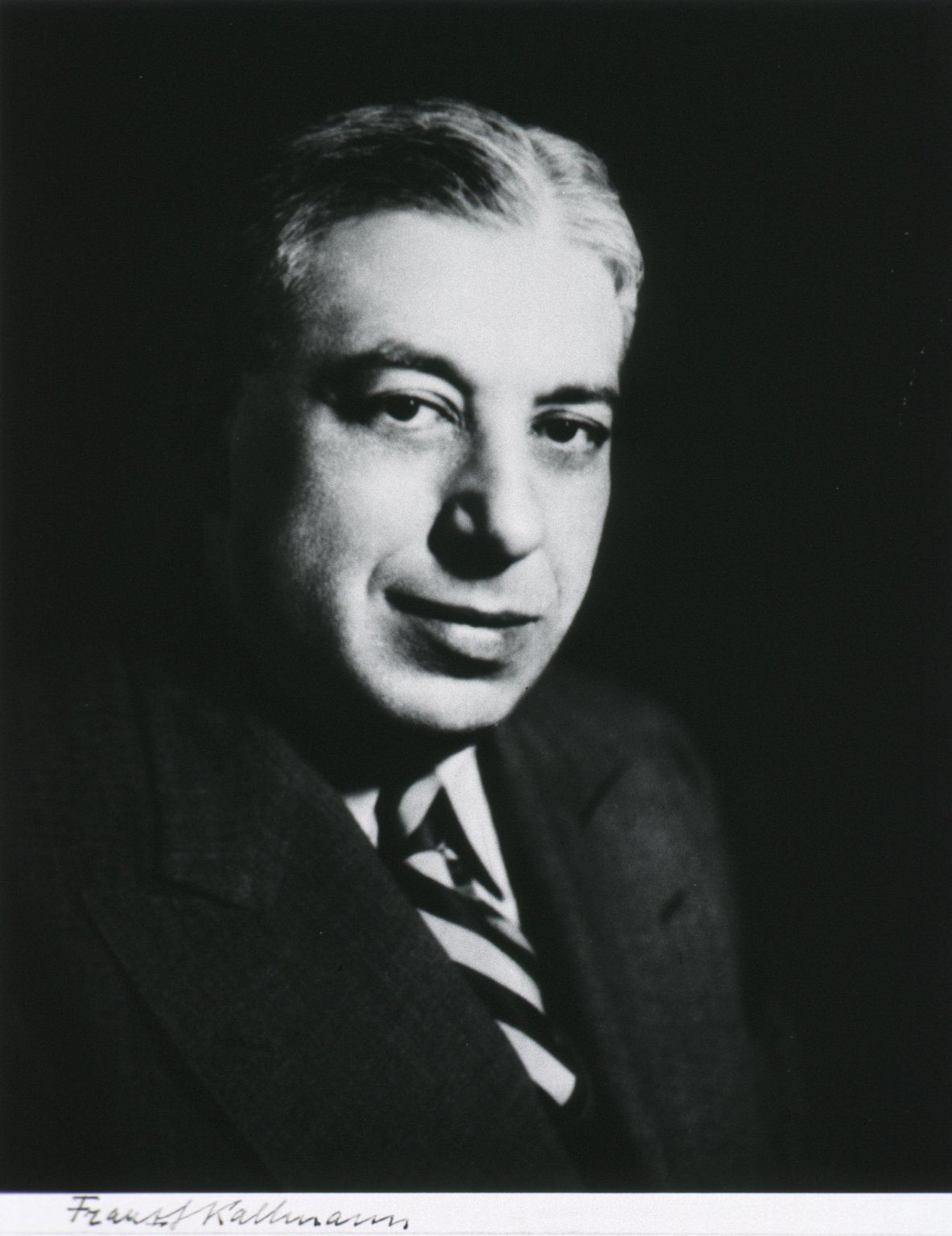
- Born: July 24, 1897; Neumarkt, Silesia
- Died: May 12, 1965 (aged 67); New York
- Known for: Kallmann's syndrome
- Scientific career
- Fields: Psychiatry

Franz Josef Kallmann, MD (July 24, 1897 – May 12, 1965), a German-born American psychiatrist, was one of the pioneers in the study of the genetic basis of psychiatric disorders. He developed the use of twin studies in the assessment of the relative roles of heredity and the environment in the pathogenesis of psychiatric disease.

Kallmann was born in Neumarkt, Silesia, the son of Marie (née Mordze / Modrey) and Bruno Kallmann, who was a surgeon and general practitioner. He fled Germany in 1936 for the United States, because he was of Jewish heritage. Paradoxically, he had been a student of Ernst Rüdin, one of the architects of racial hygiene policies in Nazi Germany. In a speech delivered in 1935, while still in Germany, he advocated the examination of relatives of schizophrenia patients with the aim to find and sterilize the "nonaffected carriers" of the supposed recessive gene responsible for the condition.

In 1944, he described a congenital endocrine condition (hypogonadotropic hypogonadism with anosmia) that has come to be known as Kallmann's syndrome.

He was a member of the American eugenics movement during his time in the United States, continuing to lecture on negative eugenics methods even into the 1960s.

In 1948, he became one of the founders of the American Society of Human Genetics.

He died in New York.

== Partial bibliography ==
- The genetics of schizophrenia; a study of heredity and reproduction of the families of 1,087 schizophrenics. New York: JJ Augustin, 1938. 291 ss.
- Kallmann FJ, Reisner FJ. Twin studies on the significance of genetic factors in tuberculosis. The American Review of Tuberculosis 47, s. 549 (1943)
- The genetic aspects of primary eunocchoidism (1944)
- The genetic theory of schizophrenia. The American Journal of Psychiatry 103: 309 (1946)
- Modern concepts of genetics in relation to mental health and abnormal personality development. Psychiatric Quarterly 21, 4, 535-553 (1947) DOI:10.1007/BF01654317
- The genetics of psychoses; an analysis of 1,232 twin index families. American Journal of Human Genetics 4, ss. 385–390 (1950)
- Heredity in Health and Mental Disorder (1953)
- Zur Symptomatologie der Gehirnzystizerkose. Mschr. Psychiat. Neur. (1929)
- Marcuse H, Kallmann F. Zur Sulfosinbehandlung der Paralyse und Schizophrenie. Nervenarzt 2: 149-53 (1929)

== See also ==
- Kallmann syndrome
