= Aureliano Maestre de San Juan =

Spanish anatomist (1828–1890)

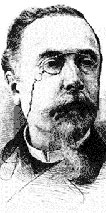
- Born: 17 October 1828; Granada, Spain
- Died: 1 June 1890 (aged 61); Alicante, Spain
- Known for: Kallmann syndrome
- Scientific career
- Fields: Anatomy
- Workplaces: University of Granada, Complutense University of Madrid

Aureliano Maestre de San Juan ( October 17, 1828 - June 1, 1890) was a Spanish scientist, histologist, physician and anatomist. He is credited as being one of the first scientists to recognize the disorder known as Kallmann syndrome. He died in 1890, having been blinded in a laboratory accident involving caustic soda two years earlier.

== See also ==
- Kallmann syndrome
