= Rabconnectin-3A =

Gene

Identifiers
- Organism: Drosophila melanogaster
- Symbol: Rbcn-3A
- Orthologs: OMA: entry
- UniProt: Q24593
Search for
- Structures: Swiss-model
- Domains: InterPro

Rabconnectin-3A (Rbcn-3A) or DmX (Drosophila melanogaster X-gene) is a gene located on the X chromosome in Drosophila and encodes for the relatively large WD-repeat protein, rabconnectin-3A. Rabconnectin-3A is involved in Notch signalling by regulating the vacuolar proton pump V-ATPase. DmX is a highly conserved gene and is widely found in insects and mammals. Two orthologs of DmX exist in humans, DMXL1 and DMXL2, the latter of which codes for the synaptic protein rabconnectin-3α. Its name comes from the fact that it binds the Ras-related protein Rab3 (human RAB3A).

== Discovery ==
The discovery of DmX was published in the journal Gene in 1998. It was discovered using a comparative genomics approach that found sequence homology to CpY, a gene found in the sex determining region of the Y chromosome of the hoverfly C. piger.

== Gene ==
DmX is located in region 5D5/6-E1 of the X chromosome in Drosophila. The gene is approximately 16 kb long. It includes 15 exons which make up a transcript with a length of 11.5 kb. DmX has a relatively small promoter region that is likely shorter than 200 bp, leaving little space for regulatory elements. It was suggested that regulatory elements may be present within the first intron which is unusually large at more than 2.4 kb long.

=== Expression ===
The transcript for DmX was found in Drosophila embryos, larvae, and adults in both males and females, indicating that the gene is expressed in all developmental stages of Drosophila and does not have sex-specific expression. Although DmX was discovered as a homologue for CpY, a gene involved in sex-determination, it does not appear to play a role in sex-determination in Drosophila, as indicated by its non-sex-specific expression.

== Protein ==
DmX encodes for the relatively large protein rabconnectin-3A, which consists of 3427 amino acids and has a molecular weight of approximately 380 kDa. Rabconnectin-3A belongs to the superfamily of WD-repeat proteins which consists of mainly regulatory proteins involved in a variety of cellular processes. All WD-repeat proteins contain a moderately conserved WD-repeat motif that consists of approximately 40 amino acids ending with a tryptophan-aspartate (WD) dipeptide. The motif is likely responsible for protein-protein interactions. In most WD-repeat proteins the motif is repeated four to eight times. DmX has an unusually high repetition of the WD-repeat motif at approximately 30 repeats. It has been suggested that DmX may be a member of a novel class of WD-repeat proteins which contain significantly more motif repeats.

== Role in Notch Signalling ==
Rabconnectin-3A forms a stable complex with rabconnectin-3B. The rabconnectin-3 complex is involved in regulating Notch signalling, although its exact function is unclear. Notch signalling is an important pathway involved in cell-cell communication. The pathway regulates the proliferation, differentiation, and death of cells. Signals are transduced by the cell-surface receptor Notch. During Notch synthesis there are three independent cleavage events. The third cleavage event in Notch synthesis is carried out by γ-secretase. This process requires the proton pump V-ATPase which is regulated by the rabconnectin-3 complex. When Rbcn-3A or Rbcn-3B are absent, Notch synthesis is disrupted between the second and third cleavage events, and Notch is subsequently prevented from entering the nucleus.

== Orthologs ==
Orthologs of DmX exist in a wide variety of species including C. elegans, yeast, mice, and humans. In zebrafish, rabconnectin-3a is involved in neural crest migration by playing a role in endosomal maturation in neural crest cells. The DmX ortholog in yeast is RAV1. Rav1 is one of three subunits which make up the RAVE complex which is involved in V-ATPase assembly.

=== Human ===
Two orthologs for the DmX gene have been discovered in humans, DMXL1 and DMXL2. The duplication event that resulted in the two homologues likely occurred in early vertebrates.

==== DMXL1 ====
DMXL1 is located on chromosome 5 and codes for a large WD-repeat protein consisting of 3027 amino acids and approximately 28 WD-repeat units. It is expressed in a number of different tissues. Its function is unknown. In a paper published in 2011, mutations occurring in DMXL1 were linked to tumour growth.

==== DMXL2 ====
DMXL2 is located on chromosome 15 and encodes the synaptic protein rabconnectin-3α. DMXL2 plays a role in puberty and is a regulator of Notch signalling. Haploinsufficiency of DMXL2 causes delayed puberty, reduced fertility, and abnormal glucose metabolism. A study published in 2015 identified DMXL2 as a biomarker for ERα positive breast cancer. DMXL2 has also been linked to hearing loss, suggesting that it is involved in inner ear functioning.
