= MVT-602 =

Chemical compound

Clinical data
- Other names: RVT-602; TAK-448

Identifiers
- IUPAC name: (2S)-2-[[(2S,4R)-1-[(2R)-2-acetamido-3-(4-hydroxyphenyl)propanoyl]-4-hydroxypyrrolidine-2-carbonyl]amino]-N-[(2S,3R)-1-[[(2S)-1-[2-[[(2S)-1-[[(2S)-1-[[(2S)-1-amino-3-(1H-indol-3-yl)-1-oxopropan-2-yl]amino]-5-[(N'-methylcarbamimidoyl)amino]-1-oxopentan-2-yl]amino]-4-methyl-1-oxopentan-2-yl]carbamoyl]hydrazinyl]-1-oxo-3-phenylpropan-2-yl]amino]-3-hydroxy-1-oxobutan-2-yl]butanediamide or Ac-D-Tyr-Hyp-Asn-Thr-Phe-Unk-Leu-Arg(Me)-Trp-NH_{2}
- CAS Number: 1234319-68-6
- PubChem CID: 46700761
- IUPHAR/BPS: 10222
- DrugBank: DB11975
- UNII: YO029HR229
- ChEMBL: ChEMBL3924151
- CompTox Dashboard (EPA): DTXSID401337050

Chemical and physical data
- Formula: C_{58}H_{80}N_{16}O_{14}
- Molar mass: 1225.376 g·mol^{−1}
- 3D model (JSmol): Interactive image
- SMILES: C[C@H]([C@@H](C(=O)N[C@@H](CC1=CC=CC=C1)C(=O)NNC(=O)N[C@@H](CC(C)C)C(=O)N[C@@H](CCCNC(=NC)N)C(=O)N[C@@H](CC2=CNC3=CC=CC=C32)C(=O)N)NC(=O)[C@H](CC(=O)N)NC(=O)[C@@H]4C[C@H](CN4C(=O)[C@@H](CC5=CC=C(C=C5)O)NC(=O)C)O)O
- InChI: InChI=1S/C58H80N16O14/c1-30(2)22-42(51(82)66-40(16-11-21-63-57(61)62-5)50(81)67-41(49(60)80)25-35-28-64-39-15-10-9-14-38(35)39)70-58(88)73-72-53(84)43(23-33-12-7-6-8-13-33)69-55(86)48(31(3)75)71-52(83)44(27-47(59)79)68-54(85)46-26-37(78)29-74(46)56(87)45(65-32(4)76)24-34-17-19-36(77)20-18-34/h6-10,12-15,17-20,28,30-31,37,40-46,48,64,75,77-78H,11,16,21-27,29H2,1-5H3,(H2,59,79)(H2,60,80)(H,65,76)(H,66,82)(H,67,81)(H,68,85)(H,69,86)(H,71,83)(H,72,84)(H3,61,62,63)(H2,70,73,88)/t31-,37-,40+,41+,42+,43+,44+,45-,46+,48+/m1/s1; Key:MWXWMWSUUYXMRA-GRKBUMBKSA-N

MVT-602 (other developmental code names RVT-602, TAK-448) is a kisspeptin receptor agonist which is under development for the treatment of female infertility and hypogonadism. It has been found to increase luteinizing hormone levels in premenopausal women. As of March 2021, MVT-602 is in phase 2 clinical trials for the treatment of female infertility and hypogonadism. It was also under development for the treatment of prostate cancer, but development for this indication was discontinued.
