= C17orf75 =

Protein-coding gene in the species Homo sapiens

Identifiers
- Aliases: C17orf75, NJMU-R1, SRI2, chromosome 17 open reading frame 75
- External IDs: MGI: 1917841; GeneCards: C17orf75

Gene location (Human)
Chr.	Chromosome 17 (human)
Band	17q11.2	Start	32,324,565 bp
Band	17q11.2	End	32,350,023 bp

Gene location (Mouse)
Chr.	Chromosome 11 (mouse)
Band	11|11 B5	Start	80,251,318 bp
Band	11|11 B5	End	80,268,860 bp
RNA expression pattern
Bgee	Human / Mouse (ortholog); Top expressed in: right testis; left testis; ganglionic eminence; right adrenal cortex; right uterine tube; ventricular zone; oocyte; left adrenal gland; anterior pituitary; left adrenal cortex / Top expressed in: muscle of thigh; knee joint; dentate gyrus of hippocampal formation granule cell; Rostral migratory stream; triceps brachii muscle; quadriceps femoris muscle; superior frontal gyrus; medial head of gastrocnemius muscle; tibialis anterior muscle; sternocleidomastoid muscle; More reference expression data
BioGPS	n/a
Gene ontology
Molecular function	molecular function; protein binding
Cellular component	cellular component; trans-Golgi network; cytoplasmic vesicle; Golgi apparatus
Biological process	intracellular protein transport; vesicle tethering to Golgi
Sources:Amigo / QuickGO
Orthologs
Databases	NCBI: entry; OMA: entry
Species	Human	Mouse
Entrez	64149	70591
Ensembl	ENSG00000108666	ENSMUSG00000057181
UniProt	Q9HAS0	Q9CYI0
RefSeq (mRNA)	NM_022344	NM_027472
RefSeq (protein)	NP_071739	NP_081748
Location (UCSC)	Chr 17: 32.32 – 32.35 Mb	Chr 11: 80.25 – 80.27 Mb
PubMed search
- Wikidata
View/Edit Human	View/Edit Mouse

Protein Njmu-R1 is a protein that in humans is encoded by the C17orf75 gene. C17orf75 is also known as SRI2 (sensitization to ricin complex subunit 2) and is a human protein encoding gene located at 17q11.2 on the complementary strand. The C17orf75 gene is ubiquitously expressed at medium-low levels throughout the body and at slightly higher levels in the brain and testes. This protein is thought to be part of a complex associated with Golgi-mediated vesicle capture.

== Gene ==
The C17orf75 gene spans from position 32,328,441 to position 32,342,173 with a length of 13,733 nucleotides. The length after intron excision is 4,547 nucleotides, and the coding sequence is 1,191 nucleotides in length. C17orf75 has 10 exons.

== RNA ==
C17orf75 has 4 transcript isoforms: C17orf75 and 3 predicted isoforms which are C17orf75 transcript variant X1 (4,568 nucleotides in length), C17orf75 transcript variant X2 (4,449 nucleotides in length), and C17orf75 transcript variant X3 (4,464 nucleotides in length).

== Protein ==
=== Structure ===
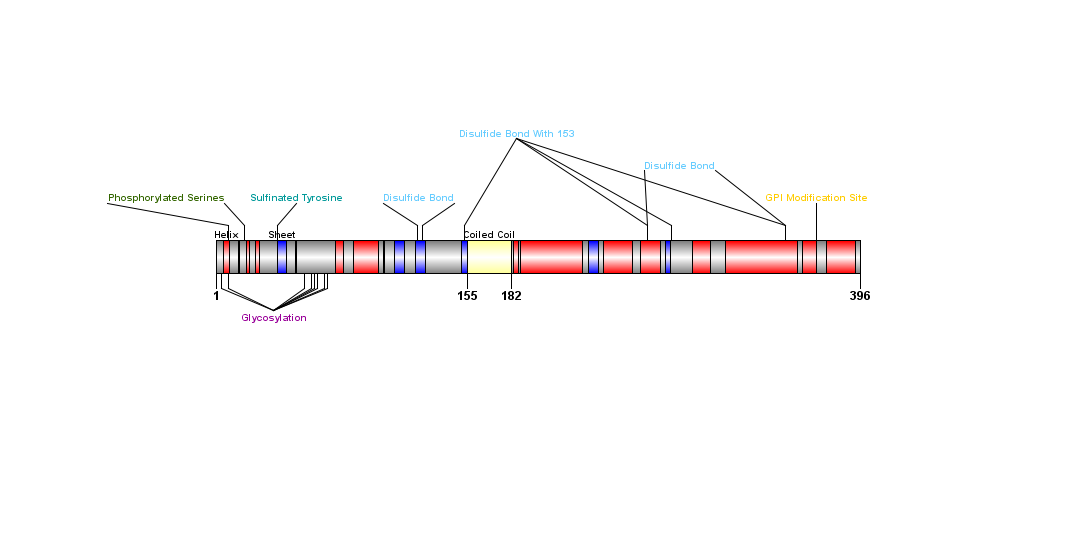
Diagram of the protein NJMU-R1's secondary structure and post-translational modifications.

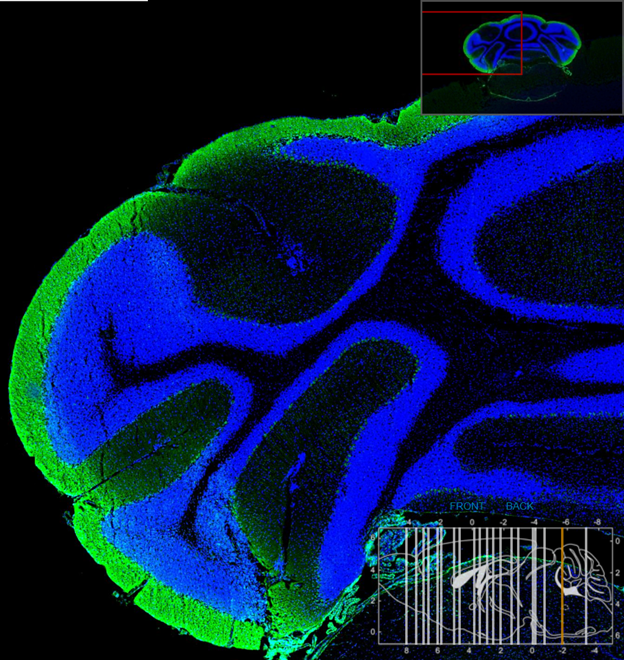
Immunohistochemistry staining of the mouse cerebellum for the protein NJMU-R1 in green.

The primary isoform of the protein NJMU-R1 is 396 amino acids long. The theoretical isoelectric point for the protein NJMU-R1 is around 5, and its predicted molecular weight is around 44 kD. This protein has a leucine zipper that is predicted to contribute to a coiled coil in the protein's folded structure. The secondary structure of the protein is predicted to dominated by helices, with some beta sheets. 3 potential disulfide bridge sites via cysteine residues are predicted in the protein.

=== Post-Translational Modifications ===
The protein NJMU-R1 has two experimentally determined serine phosphorylation sites near the N-terminus. Predicted post-translational modifications include tyrosine sulfation, O-linked glycosylation, and GPI anchor attachment.

=== Tissue Localization ===
Immunohistochemistry staining images show moderate protein levels throughout mouse brain tissues, but the Purkinje layer in the cerebellum shows a distinctly high level of protein concentration, especially as compared to the neighboring granular layer. There are also high protein concentrations in the circumventricular organs of the mouse brain.

=== Cellular Localization ===
Within the cell, images have shown the protein to be clustered in the cytosol and near the Golgi apparatus. The PSORTII tool also predicts that this protein is localized to the cytosol.

== Expression Data ==
RNA sequencing data shows that C17orf75 is expressed highly in the testes, brain, and at moderately elevated levels in the kidney and thyroid. Microarray data shows that this gene is expressed ubiquitously in most tissues, with moderate-to-high expression in the brain and testes and moderate-to-low expression in all other tissues.

Expression levels of C17orf75 are seen to be higher in colorectal and other cancers, suggesting that C17orf75 may be a protooncogene or that there is another element of the gene's regulation that is causing these elevated levels.

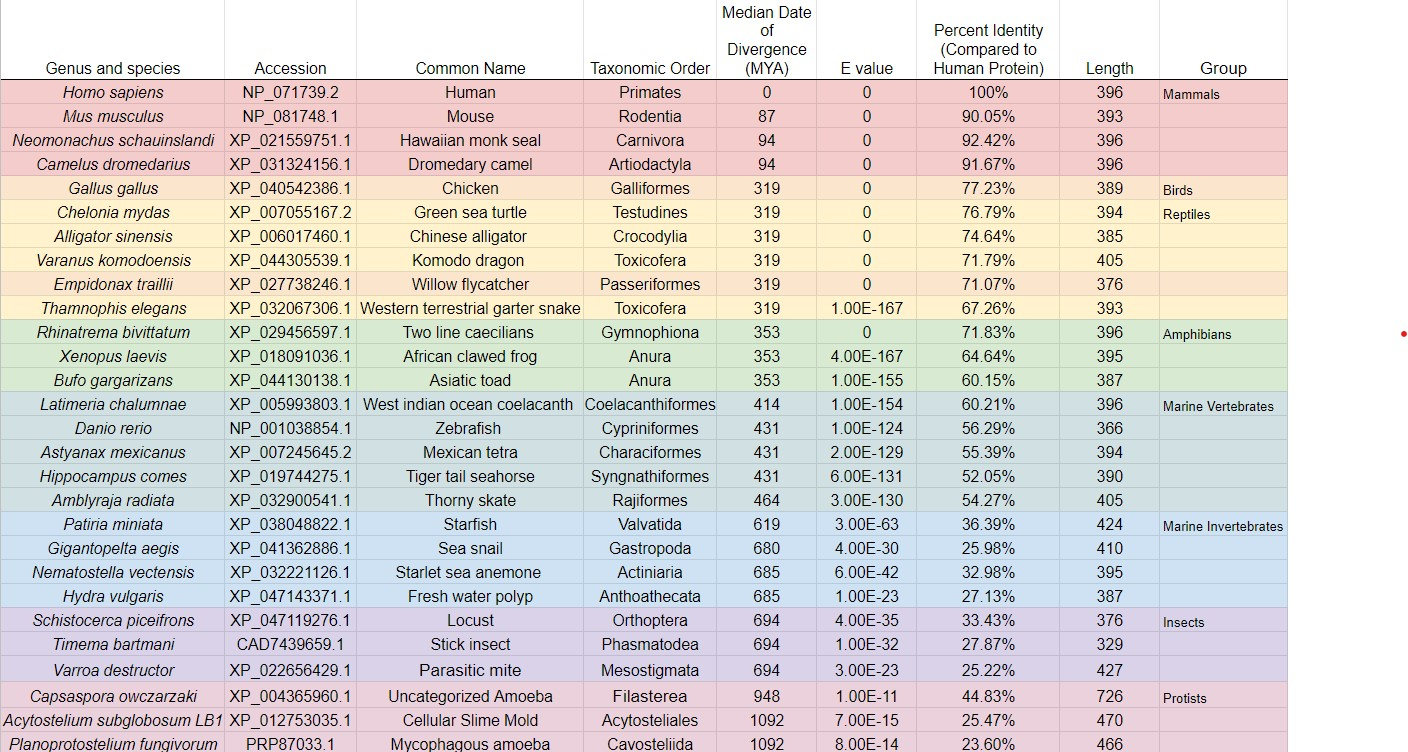
Human C17orf75 orthologs in select species obtained from a BLASTP search using the human protein with accession number: NP_071739.2.

== Homology ==
The C17orf75 gene has orthologs as distantly related as amoeba and slime molds that are approximately 1,092,000,000 years old. It is seen in most animals that diverged since then, such as insects, though, notably, not Drosophila, marine vertebrates, marine invertebrates, 14 amphibians (only frogs/toads and caecilians), reptiles, birds, and mammals.

== Protein Interactions ==
Research findings show that NJMU-R1 is predicted to be part of a trimer (with FAM91A1 [Family With Sequence Similarity 91 Member A1] and SRI1), as elicited through immunoprecipitation, fractionation, and mass spectrometry. This trimer has been proposed to promote the Golgi’s capture of vesicles, particularly vesicles involved with the AB toxin, ricin, as knockouts of C17orf75 lead to higher cell susceptibility to ricin.
