= POLR3K =

Protein-coding gene in the species Homo sapiens

Identifiers
- Aliases: POLR3K, C11, C11-RNP3, RPC10, RPC11, RPC12.5, My010, polymerase (RNA) III subunit K, RNA polymerase III subunit K, HLD21
- External IDs: OMIM: 606007; MGI: 1914255; GeneCards: POLR3K

Gene location (Human)
| Chr. | Chromosome 16 (human) |
| Band | 16p13.3 | Start | 46,407 bp |
| Band | 16p13.3 | End | 53,608 bp |

Gene location (Mouse)
| Chr. | Chromosome 2 (mouse) |
| Band | 2|2 H4 | Start | 181,506,130 bp |
| Band | 2|2 H4 | End | 181,512,623 bp |
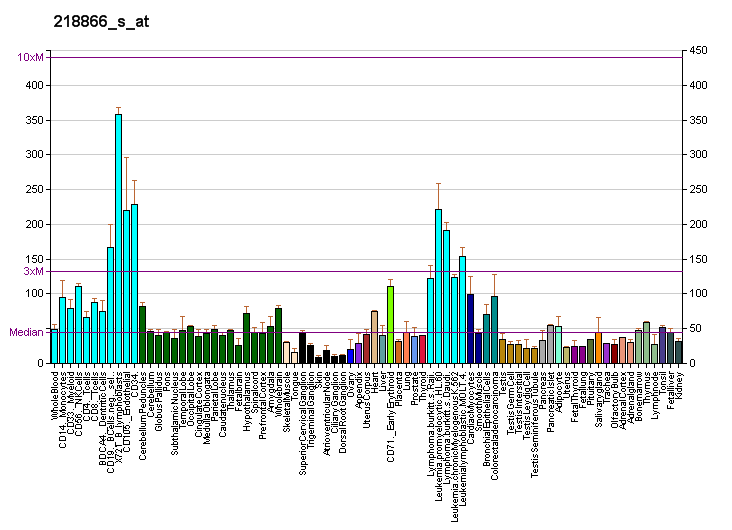
RNA expression pattern
| Bgee | Human / Mouse (ortholog); Top expressed in: mucosa of transverse colon; prefrontal cortex; gonad; biceps brachii; thoracic diaphragm; Skeletal muscle tissue of biceps brachii; Skeletal muscle tissue of rectus abdominis; monocyte; anterior cingulate cortex; granulocyte / Top expressed in: ciliary body; retinal pigment epithelium; iris; medial ganglionic eminence; otic placode; abdominal wall; maxillary prominence; mandibular prominence; primitive streak; urothelium; More reference expression data |
| BioGPS | More reference expression data |
Gene ontology
| Molecular function | nucleic acid binding; DNA-directed 5'-3' RNA polymerase activity; zinc ion binding; metal ion binding; RNA polymerase III activity |
| Cellular component | RNA polymerase III complex; cytosol; nucleolus; nucleus; nucleoplasm |
| Biological process | immune system process; defense response to virus; transcription, DNA-templated; transcription by RNA polymerase III; innate immune response; termination of RNA polymerase III transcription; tRNA 3'-trailer cleavage; positive regulation of type I interferon production |
Sources:Amigo / QuickGO
Orthologs
| Databases | NCBI: entry; OMA: entry |
| Species | Human | Mouse |
| Entrez | 51728 | 67005 |
| Ensembl | ENSG00000161980 | ENSMUSG00000038628 |
| UniProt | Q9Y2Y1 | Q9CQZ7 |
| RefSeq (mRNA) | NM_016310 | NM_025901 |
| RefSeq (protein) | NP_057394 | NP_080177 |
| Location (UCSC) | Chr 16: 0.05 – 0.05 Mb | Chr 2: 181.51 – 181.51 Mb |
| PubMed search |
- Wikidata
| View/Edit Human | View/Edit Mouse |

DNA-directed RNA polymerase III subunit RPC10 is an enzyme that in humans is encoded by the POLR3K gene.

This gene encodes a small essential subunit of RNA polymerase III, the polymerase responsible for synthesizing transfer and small ribosomal RNAs in eukaryotes.

The carboxy-terminal domain of this subunit shares a high degree of sequence similarity to the carboxy-terminal domain of an RNA polymerase II elongation factor. This similarity in sequence is supported by functional studies showing that this subunit is required for proper pausing and termination during transcription.
