= H14 =

H14 may refer to:

- HMS Active (H14), a British Royal Navy destroyer which saw service during World War II
- HMAS Stalwart (H14), a Royal Australian Navy destroyer in service in the 1920s
- London Buses route H14, a public transportation route in England
