= DMXL2 =

Protein-coding gene in humans

Identifiers
- Aliases: DMXL2, RC3, PEPNS, Dmx like 2, DFNA71, EIEE81
- External IDs: OMIM: 612186; MGI: 2444630; GeneCards: DMXL2

Gene location (Human)
| Chr. | Chromosome 15 (human) |
| Band | 15q21.2 | Start | 51,447,711 bp |
| Band | 15q21.2 | End | 51,622,833 bp |

Gene location (Mouse)
| Chr. | Chromosome 9 (mouse) |
| Band | 9|9 A5.3 | Start | 54,272,442 bp |
| Band | 9|9 A5.3 | End | 54,408,910 bp |
RNA expression pattern
| Bgee | Human / Mouse (ortholog); Top expressed in: monocyte; granulocyte; postcentral gyrus; Brodmann area 9; corpus epididymis; pars compacta; right uterine tube; cerebellar cortex; lateral nuclear group of thalamus; cerebellar hemisphere / Top expressed in: superior cervical ganglion; lobe of cerebellum; anterior amygdaloid area; subiculum; iris; cerebellar vermis; primary motor cortex; Epithelium of choroid plexus; piriform cortex; pontine nuclei; More reference expression data |
| BioGPS | n/a |
Orthologs
| Databases | NCBI: entry; OMA: entry |
| Species | Human | Mouse |
| Entrez | 23312 | 235380 |
| Ensembl | ENSG00000104093 | ENSMUSG00000041268 |
| UniProt | Q8TDJ6 | Q8BPN8 |
| RefSeq (mRNA) | NM_001174116; NM_001174117; NM_015263 | NM_172771 |
| RefSeq (protein) | NP_001167587; NP_001167588; NP_056078; NP_001365386; NP_001365387 NP_001365388; NP_001365389; NP_001365390; NP_001365391; NP_001365392; NP_001365393 | NP_766359 |
| Location (UCSC) | Chr 15: 51.45 – 51.62 Mb | Chr 9: 54.27 – 54.41 Mb |
| PubMed search |
- Wikidata
| View/Edit Human | View/Edit Mouse |

Dmx-like 2 is a protein that in humans is encoded by the DMXL2 gene.

== Function ==
This gene encodes a protein with 12 WD domains. Proteins with WD domains are involved in many functions including participation in signal transduction pathways. Participation of the encoded protein in regulation of the Notch signaling pathway has been demonstrated in vitro using several human celines. A gene encoding a similar protein is located on chromosome 5. Multiple transcript variants encoding different isoforms have been found for this gene.

== Clinical relevance ==
Haplosufficiency of Dmxl2 has been identified as the cause of Polyendocrine-polyneuropathy syndrome, and delayed puberty. Research has indicated that this is a result of altered function of CNS synapses (in which the protein product of Dmxl2 is expressed) causing altered activation of the GnRH neurons of the hypothalamus.

== See also ==
- DmX gene - the homolog in D. melanogaster
