= Anosmin-1 =

Secreted glycoprotein of the extracellular matrix

ANOS1

Identifiers
- Aliases: ANOS1, ADMLX, HH1, HHA, KAL, KALIG-1, KMS, WFDC19, KAL1, anosmin 1, anosmin-1
- External IDs: OMIM: 300836; GeneCards: ANOS1
Available structures
PDB	Human UniProt search: PDBe RCSB
PDB	List of PDB id codes 1ZLG

Gene location (Human)
Chr.	X chromosome (human)
Band	Xp22.31	Start	8,528,874 bp
Band	Xp22.31	End	8,732,137 bp
RNA expression pattern
Bgee	Human / Mouse (ortholog); Top expressed in: visceral pleura; hair follicle; Skeletal muscle tissue of rectus abdominis; tibia; glutes; bronchial epithelial cell; lower lobe of lung; triceps brachii muscle; parietal pleura; mucosa of paranasal sinus / n/a; More reference expression data
BioGPS	n/a
Gene ontology
Molecular function	peptidase inhibitor activity; heparin binding; extracellular matrix structural constituent; protein binding; serine-type endopeptidase inhibitor activity
Cellular component	plasma membrane; membrane; extracellular region; extracellular space; extracellular matrix
Biological process	negative regulation of peptidase activity; cell adhesion; negative regulation of endopeptidase activity; axon guidance; fibroblast growth factor receptor signaling pathway; chemotaxis
Sources:Amigo / QuickGO
Orthologs
Databases	NCBI: entry; OMA: entry
Species	Human	Mouse
Entrez	3730	n/a
Ensembl	ENSG00000011201	n/a
UniProt	P23352	n/a
RefSeq (mRNA)	NM_000216	n/a
RefSeq (protein)	NP_000207	n/a
Location (UCSC)	Chr X: 8.53 – 8.73 Mb	n/a
PubMed search		n/a
- Wikidata
View/Edit Human

Anosmin-1

Identifiers
- Symbol: ANOS1
- Alt. symbols: KAL1, ADMLX
- Alt. names: Adhesion molecule-like X-linked, Kallmann syndrome protein
- NCBI gene: 3730
- HGNC: 6211
- OMIM: 308700
- RefSeq: NM_000216
- UniProt: P23352

Other data
- Locus: Chr. X p22.32
Search for
- Structures: Swiss-model
- Domains: InterPro

Anosmin-1 is a secreted, EM associated glycoprotein found in humans and other organisms responsible for normal development, which is expressed in the brain, spinal cord and kidney. Absence or damage to the protein results in Kallmann syndrome in humans, which is characterized by loss of olfactory bulbs and GnRH secretion leading to anosmia and hypothalamic hypogonadotropic hypogonadism. Anosmin-1 is coded by the ANOS1 gene, which is found on the X chromosome. Anosmin-1 is 100 kilodaltons and is expressed on the outside of cells. Because of this and because of its contribution to normal migration of nerve cells, a role in the extracellular matrix has been postulated.

== Function ==
During neural crest cell development, anosmin-1 plays a role in cranial neural cell formation by spatiotemporal regulation. Secreated anosmin-1 enhances FGF activity by promoting FGF8-FGFR1 complex formation, whereas inhibits both BMP5 and WNT3A activities. As a results, orchestrated regulation of FGF, BMP, and WNT by anosmin-1 control EMT and MET during neural crest cell development. In human retinal pigment epithelial cell (RPE), the expression of anosmin-1 is regulated by TGF-β which remain to be investigated.

== Structure and pathology ==
Anosmin-1 is encoded by a gene ANOS1 (earlier called ADMLX, KAL, KAL1, KALIG1). In human it is located on the X chromosome at Xp22.3 and is affected in some male individuals with Kallmann syndrome. This gene codes for a protein of the extracellular matrix named anosmin-1, which is involved in the migration of certain nerve cell precursors (neuroendocrine GnRH cells) during embryogenesis. Deletion or mutation of this gene results in loss of the functional protein and affects the proper development of the olfactory nerves and olfactory bulbs. In addition, neural cells that produce GnRH fail to migrate to the hypothalamus.

Clinically, mutation results in the X-linked form of Kallmann syndrome. Individuals with Kallmann syndrome experience anosmia (lack of smell) and do not go through puberty (hypothalamic hypogonadotropic hypogonadism).

ANOS1 is made of 14 exons and spans 120-200 kilobases. Mutations of ANOS1 may account for 14% of the cases of familial Kallmann syndrome and 11% of male sporadic cases.
