= GNRHR =

Protein-coding gene in the species Homo sapiens

Identifiers
- Aliases: GNRHR, GNRHR1, GRHR, HH7, LHRHR, LRHR, gonadotropin releasing hormone receptor
- External IDs: OMIM: 138850; MGI: 95790; GeneCards: GNRHR

Gene location (Human)
Chr.	Chromosome 4 (human)
Band	4q13.2	Start	67,737,118 bp
Band	4q13.2	End	67,754,388 bp

Gene location (Mouse)
Chr.	Chromosome 5 (mouse)
Band	5 E1|5 43.56 cM	Start	86,328,613 bp
Band	5 E1|5 43.56 cM	End	86,345,760 bp
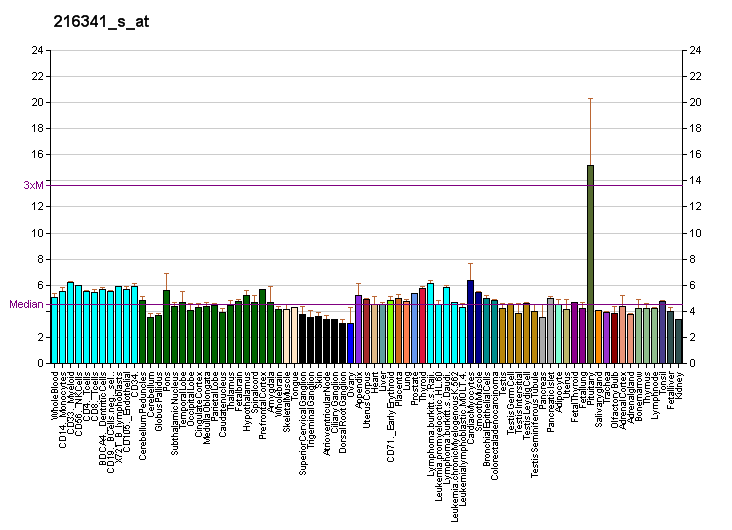

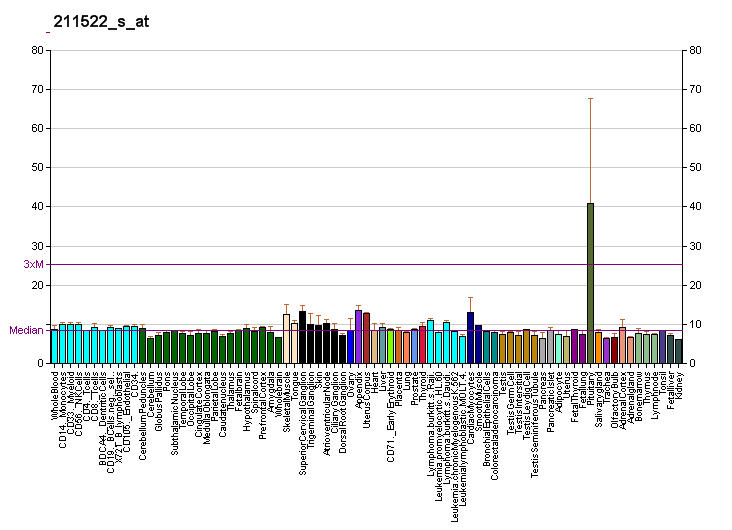

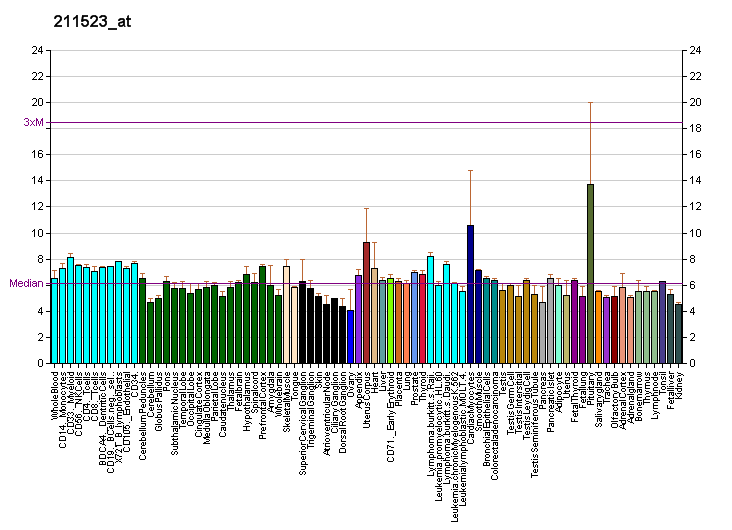
RNA expression pattern
Bgee	Human / Mouse (ortholog); Top expressed in: anterior pituitary; testicle; ganglionic eminence; ventricular zone; sural nerve; tibialis anterior muscle; prefrontal cortex; corpus callosum; gonad; deltoid muscle / Top expressed in: lumbar subsegment of spinal cord; pituitary gland; embryo; anterior pituitary; right ventricle; vastus lateralis muscle; central gray substance of midbrain; lumbar spinal ganglion; digastric muscle; nucleus of stria terminalis; More reference expression data
BioGPS	More reference expression data
Gene ontology
Molecular function	protein-hormone receptor activity; signal transducer activity; G protein-coupled receptor activity; peptide binding; gonadotropin-releasing hormone receptor activity
Cellular component	plasma membrane; membrane; integral component of membrane; integral component of plasma membrane
Biological process	multicellular organism development; signal transduction; G protein-coupled receptor signaling pathway; cellular response to gonadotropin-releasing hormone; cellular response to hormone stimulus
Sources:Amigo / QuickGO
Orthologs
Databases	NCBI: entry; OMA: entry
Species	Human	Mouse
Entrez	2798	14715
Ensembl	ENSG00000109163	ENSMUSG00000029255
UniProt	P30968	Q01776
RefSeq (mRNA)	NM_001012763; NM_000406	NM_010323; NM_001310651; NM_001310653
RefSeq (protein)	NP_000397; NP_001012781	NP_001297580; NP_001297582; NP_034453
Location (UCSC)	Chr 4: 67.74 – 67.75 Mb	Chr 5: 86.33 – 86.35 Mb
PubMed search
- Wikidata
View/Edit Human	View/Edit Mouse

Gonadotropin-releasing hormone receptor is a protein that in humans is encoded by the GNRHR gene.

This gene encodes the receptor for type 1 gonadotropin-releasing hormone. This receptor is a member of the seven-transmembrane, G-protein coupled receptor (GPCR) family. It is expressed on the surface of pituitary gonadotrope cells as well as lymphocytes, breast, ovary, and prostate. Following binding of gonadotropin-releasing hormone, the receptor associates with G-proteins that activate a phosphatidylinositol-calcium second messenger system. Activation of the receptor ultimately causes the release of gonadotropic luteinizing hormone (LH) and follicle stimulating hormone (FSH). Defects in this gene are a cause of hypogonadotropic hypogonadism (HH). Alternative splicing results in multiple transcript variants encoding different isoforms. More than 18 transcription initiation sites in the 5' region and multiple polyA signals in the 3' region have been identified for this gene.

== See also ==
- Gonadotropin-releasing hormone receptor
