= POLR3B =

Human genetic RNA polymerase III enzyme

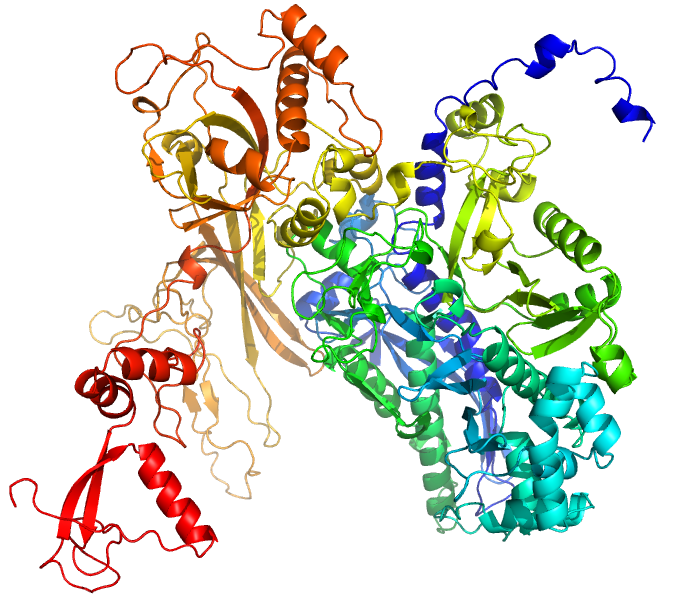

Identifiers
- Aliases: POLR3B, C128, HLD8, INMAP, RPC2, polymerase (RNA) III subunit B, RNA polymerase III subunit B, CMT1I
- External IDs: OMIM: 614366; MGI: 1917678; GeneCards: POLR3B
Enzyme activity
EC #	BRENDA	ExPASy	KEGG	MetaCyc
2.7.7.6	↗	↗	↗	↗

Gene location (Human)
Chr.	Chromosome 12 (human)
Band	12q23.3	Start	106,357,748 bp
Band	12q23.3	End	106,510,198 bp

Gene location (Mouse)
Chr.	Chromosome 10 (mouse)
Band	10|10 C1	Start	84,458,156 bp
Band	10|10 C1	End	84,563,042 bp
RNA expression pattern
Bgee	Human / Mouse (ortholog); Top expressed in: secondary oocyte; endothelial cell; gingival epithelium; amniotic fluid; hair follicle; kidney tubule; germinal epithelium; Epithelium of choroid plexus; tibialis anterior muscle; gonad / Top expressed in: tail of embryo; genital tubercle; lumbar spinal ganglion; epiblast; hand; submandibular gland; granulocyte; secondary oocyte; primitive streak; zygote; More reference expression data
BioGPS	n/a
Gene ontology
Molecular function	transferase activity; DNA binding; nucleotidyltransferase activity; ribonucleoside binding; metal ion binding; RNA polymerase III activity; DNA-directed 5'-3' RNA polymerase activity
Cellular component	cytosol; nucleoplasm; RNA polymerase III complex; nucleus
Biological process	immune system process; transcription, DNA-templated; defense response to virus; positive regulation of innate immune response; positive regulation of interferon-beta production; innate immune response; transcription by RNA polymerase III; positive regulation of type I interferon production
Sources:Amigo / QuickGO
Orthologs
Databases	NCBI: entry; OMA: entry
Species	Human	Mouse
Entrez	55703	70428
Ensembl	ENSG00000013503	ENSMUSG00000034453
UniProt	Q9NW08	P59470
RefSeq (mRNA)	NM_018082; NM_001160708	NM_027423
RefSeq (protein)	NP_001154180; NP_060552	NP_081699
Location (UCSC)	Chr 12: 106.36 – 106.51 Mb	Chr 10: 84.46 – 84.56 Mb
PubMed search
- Wikidata
View/Edit Human	View/Edit Mouse

RNA polymerase III subunit B is an enzyme that in humans is encoded by the POLR3B gene. It is the second largest subunit of RNA polymerase III. Subunit B is part of the catalytic center of the RNA polymerase III complex.

== Gene ==
The POLR3B gene is located on the long arm (q) of chromosome 12 on position 23.3, from base pair from base pair 106,357,748 to base pair 106,510,198.

== Function ==
RNA polymerase III is an essential enzyme complex responsible for synthesizing small non-coding RNAs, including transfer RNAs (tRNAs) and 5S ribosomal RNA (rRNA) and these small RNAs play a critical role in the process of protein synthesis within cells.

== Clinical significance ==
Mutations in POLR3B are associated with certain genetic disorders, such as 4H leukodystrophy and Charcot–Marie–Tooth disease type 1I.
