= FGF17 =

Protein-coding gene in the species Homo sapiens

Identifiers
- Aliases: FGF17, FGF-13, HH20, FGF-17, fibroblast growth factor 17
- External IDs: OMIM: 603725; MGI: 1202401; GeneCards: FGF17

Gene location (Human)
Chr.	Chromosome 8 (human)
Band	8p21.3	Start	22,042,398 bp
Band	8p21.3	End	22,048,809 bp

Gene location (Mouse)
Chr.	Chromosome 14 (mouse)
Band	14 D2|14 36.4 cM	Start	70,636,203 bp
Band	14 D2|14 36.4 cM	End	70,642,268 bp
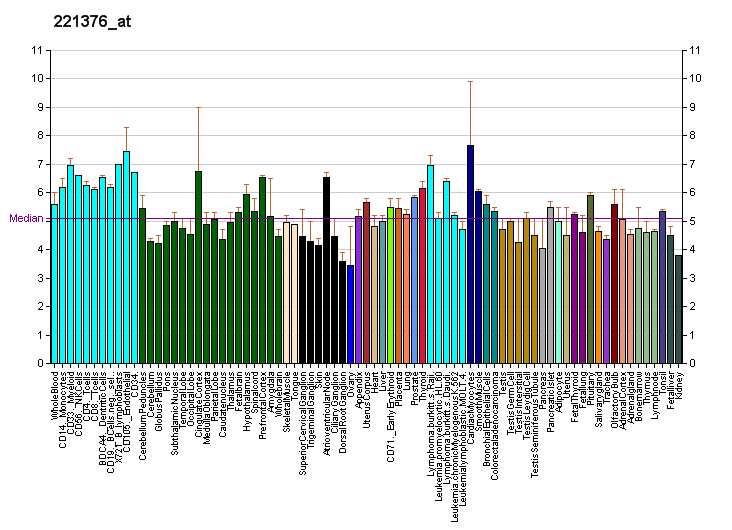
RNA expression pattern
Bgee	Human / Mouse (ortholog); Top expressed in: right hemisphere of cerebellum; right frontal lobe; testicle; anterior cingulate cortex; Brodmann area 9; gonad; nucleus accumbens; amygdala; right lobe of thyroid gland; caudate nucleus / Top expressed in: tail of embryo; lumbar subsegment of spinal cord; medial nasal prominence; embryo; embryo; vasculature of trunk; gray matter layer of cerebellum; pulmonary artery; descending aorta; Descending thoracic aorta; More reference expression data
BioGPS	More reference expression data
Gene ontology
Molecular function	fibroblast growth factor receptor binding; type 1 fibroblast growth factor receptor binding; type 2 fibroblast growth factor receptor binding; growth factor activity; protein tyrosine kinase activity; phosphatidylinositol-4,5-bisphosphate 3-kinase activity; 1-phosphatidylinositol-3-kinase activity
Cellular component	extracellular region; intracellular anatomical structure; extracellular space
Biological process	cell-cell signaling; nervous system development; MAPK cascade; multicellular organism development; fibroblast growth factor receptor signaling pathway; positive regulation of cell population proliferation; signal transduction; phosphatidylinositol phosphate biosynthetic process; peptidyl-tyrosine phosphorylation; phosphatidylinositol-3-phosphate biosynthetic process; regulation of signaling receptor activity; positive regulation of protein kinase B signaling
Sources:Amigo / QuickGO
Orthologs
Databases	NCBI: entry; OMA: entry
Species	Human	Mouse
Entrez	8822	14171
Ensembl	ENSG00000158815	ENSMUSG00000022101
UniProt	O60258	P63075
RefSeq (mRNA)	NM_001304478; NM_003867	NM_008004; NM_001360108
RefSeq (protein)	NP_001291407; NP_003858	NP_032030; NP_001347037
Location (UCSC)	Chr 8: 22.04 – 22.05 Mb	Chr 14: 70.64 – 70.64 Mb
PubMed search
- Wikidata
View/Edit Human	View/Edit Mouse

Fibroblast growth factor 17 is a protein that in humans is encoded by the FGF17 gene.

The protein encoded by this gene is a member of the fibroblast growth factor (FGF) family. FGF family members possess broad mitogenic and cell survival activities and are involved in a variety of biological processes, including embryonic development cell growth, morphogenesis, tissue repair, tumor growth, and invasion. This gene was shown to be prominently expressed in the cerebellum and cortex. The mouse homolog of this gene was localized to specific sites in the midline structures of the forebrain, the midbrain-hindbrain junction, developing skeleton and developing arteries, which suggests a role in central nervous system, bone and vascular development. This gene was referred to as FGF-13 in reference 2, however, its amino acid sequence and chromosomal localization are identical to FGF17.
