= KiSS1-derived peptide receptor =

Mammalian protein found in Homo sapiens

KISS1R

Identifiers
- Aliases: KISS1R, AXOR12, CPPB1, GPR54, HH8, HOT7T175, KISS-1R, KiSS1-derived peptide receptor, KISS1 receptor
- External IDs: OMIM: 604161; MGI: 2148793; GeneCards: KISS1R

Gene location (Human)
| Chr. | Chromosome 19 (human) |
| Band | 19p13.3 | Start | 917,287 bp |
| Band | 19p13.3 | End | 921,005 bp |

Gene location (Mouse)
| Chr. | Chromosome 10 (mouse) |
| Band | 10|10 C1 | Start | 79,752,805 bp |
| Band | 10|10 C1 | End | 79,758,107 bp |
RNA expression pattern
| Bgee | Human / Mouse (ortholog); Top expressed in: pons; endothelial cell; hypothalamus; Brodmann area 23; pancreatic ductal cell; cartilage tissue; superior vestibular nucleus; nucleus accumbens; blood; cingulate gyrus / Top expressed in: granulocyte; substantia nigra; embryo; embryo; primary visual cortex; neuron; dentate gyrus of hippocampal formation granule cell; superior frontal gyrus; right kidney; cerebellar cortex; More reference expression data |
| BioGPS | n/a |
Gene ontology
| Molecular function | G protein-coupled peptide receptor activity; G protein-coupled receptor activity; neuropeptide receptor activity; signal transducer activity; protein binding |
| Cellular component | integral component of membrane; intracellular membrane-bounded organelle; membrane; plasma membrane; integral component of plasma membrane; cell surface; cilium |
| Biological process | phospholipase C-activating G protein-coupled receptor signaling pathway; signal transduction; neuropeptide signaling pathway; G protein-coupled receptor signaling pathway |
Sources:Amigo / QuickGO
Orthologs
| Databases | NCBI: entry; OMA: entry |
| Species | Human | Mouse |
| Entrez | 84634 | 114229 |
| Ensembl | ENSG00000116014 | ENSMUSG00000035773 |
| UniProt | Q969F8 | Q91V45 |
| RefSeq (mRNA) | NM_032551 | NM_053244; NM_001359010 |
| RefSeq (protein) | NP_115940 | NP_444474; NP_001345939 |
| Location (UCSC) | Chr 19: 0.92 – 0.92 Mb | Chr 10: 79.75 – 79.76 Mb |
| PubMed search |
- Wikidata
| View/Edit Human | View/Edit Mouse |

The KiSS1-derived peptide receptor (also known as GPR54 or the Kisspeptin receptor) is a G protein-coupled receptor which binds the peptide hormone kisspeptin (metastin). Kisspeptin is encoded by the metastasis suppressor gene KISS1, which is expressed in a variety of endocrine and gonadal tissues. Activation of the kisspeptin receptor is linked to the phospholipase C and inositol trisphosphate second messenger cascades inside the cell.

Kisspeptins are neuropeptides synthesized in the hypothalamus and encoded by the KISS1 gene. The KISS1 gene encodes the G protein-coupled receptor 54 (known as KISS1R or GPR54) and plays a crucial role in regulating reproduction, pubertal maturation, and metabolic function. KISS1 neurons located in the arcuate nucleus (ARC) of the mediobasal hypothalamus (MBH) project to GnRH neurons in the median eminence, which expresses KISS1R, to stimulate LH secretions in a pulsatile manner from the anterior pituitary to initiate ovulation/ pubertal maturation. The KISS1 and KISS1R/GPR54 genes have been detected in the brain, pituitary, placenta, pancreas, liver, and small intestine.

== Function ==
Kisspeptin is involved in the regulation of endocrine function and the onset of puberty, with activation of the kisspeptin receptor triggering release of gonadotropin-releasing hormone (GnRH), and release of kisspeptin itself being inhibited by oestradiol but enhanced by GnRH. Reductions in kisspeptin levels with age may conversely be one of the reasons behind age-related declines in levels of other endocrine hormones such as luteinizing hormone.

== Clinical significance ==
Alterations in the KISS1/KISS1R signaling pathway have been linked to multiple physiological conditions, including metabolic and reproductive abnormalities. A knockout model of GPR54/KISS1R in mice showed hypogonadism, and the mice failed to reach puberty. The KISS1 gene has been stated to suppress the metastasis of malignant melanomas. KISS1R signaling pathway has been characterized in the suppression of tumors and has anti-metastatic effects in several cancers, including breast cancer.

Activation of KISS1R elicits a neuroendocrine response leading to pubertal maturation. This is indicated by intermittent kisspeptin-10 administration to pre-pubertal animals resulting in activation of the hypothalamic-pituitary axis and subsequent precocious puberty in rats and primates. Mutations in the kisspeptin receptor KISS1R have resulted in isolated hypogonadotropic hypogonadism (IHH), characterized by delayed or absence of puberty

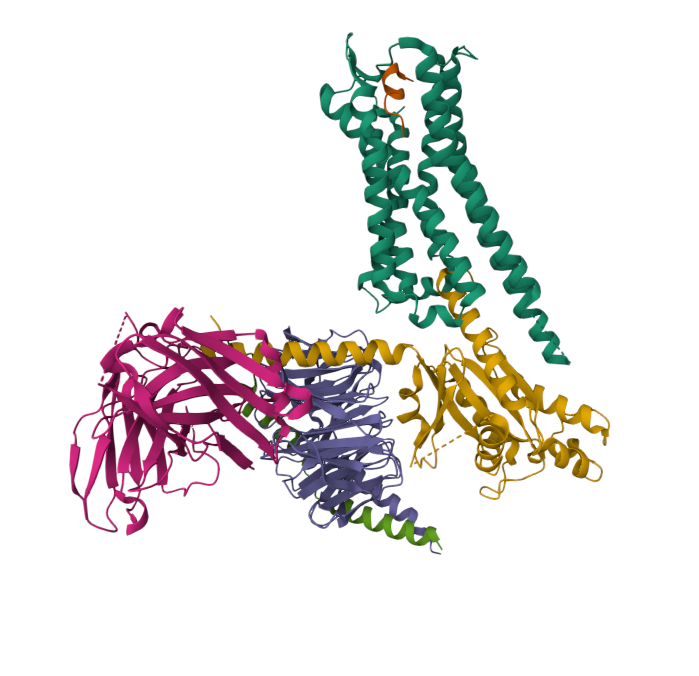
PDB: 8ZJD. Proteins shown: Kisspeptin-10 (Dark Orange), KISS1R (Teal), Gαi/Gαq Subunit (Yellow), Gβ Subunit (Purple), Gγ Subunit (Purple), scFv16 (Pink).

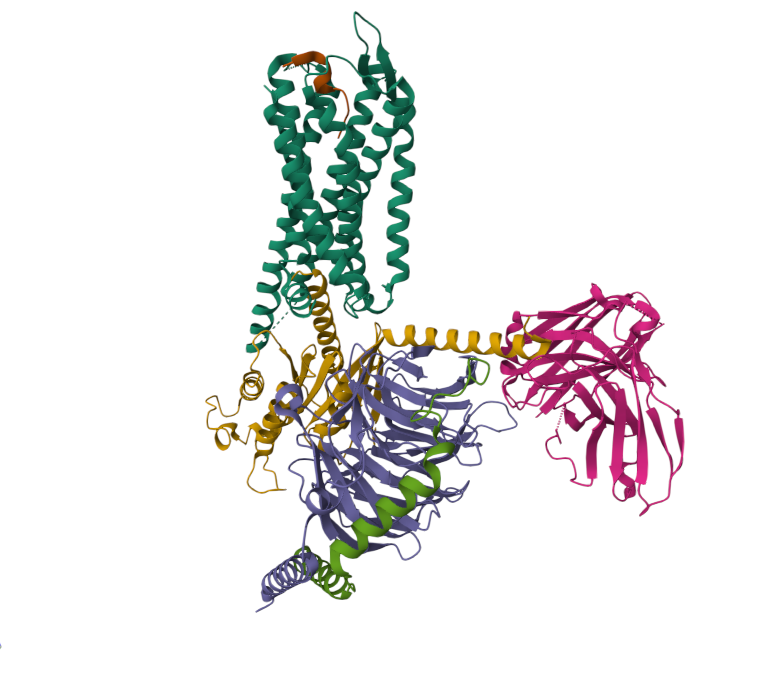
PDB: 8ZJD. Proteins shown: Kisspeptin-10 (Dark Orange), KISS1R (Teal), Gαi/Gαq Subunit (Yellow), Gβ Subunit (Purple), Gγ Subunit (Purple), scFv16 (Pink).

== Ligands ==
No non-peptide ligands for this receptor have yet been discovered, but as of 2009 both selective agonist and antagonist peptides are known.

=== Agonists ===
- Kisspeptin (kisspeptin-54, metastin)
- Kisspeptin-10 (112-121 C-terminal fragment)
- KISS1-305
- MVT-602 (RVT-602, TAK-448)
- TAK-683

=== Antagonists ===
- Kisspeptin-10 analogues modified with amino substitutions
- Kisspeptin-234
