= WD repeat-containing protein 11 =

Protein-coding gene in the species Homo sapiens

WDR11

Identifiers
- Aliases: WDR11, BRWD2, DR11, HH14, WDR15, SRI1, WD repeat domain 11
- External IDs: OMIM: 606417; MGI: 1920230; GeneCards: WDR11
Available structures
PDB	Ortholog search: PDBe RCSB
PDB	List of PDB id codes 3MB3

Gene location (Human)
Chr.	Chromosome 10 (human)
Band	10q26.12	Start	120,851,305 bp
Band	10q26.12	End	120,909,524 bp

Gene location (Mouse)
Chr.	Chromosome 7 (mouse)
Band	7|7 F3	Start	129,193,587 bp
Band	7|7 F3	End	129,237,462 bp
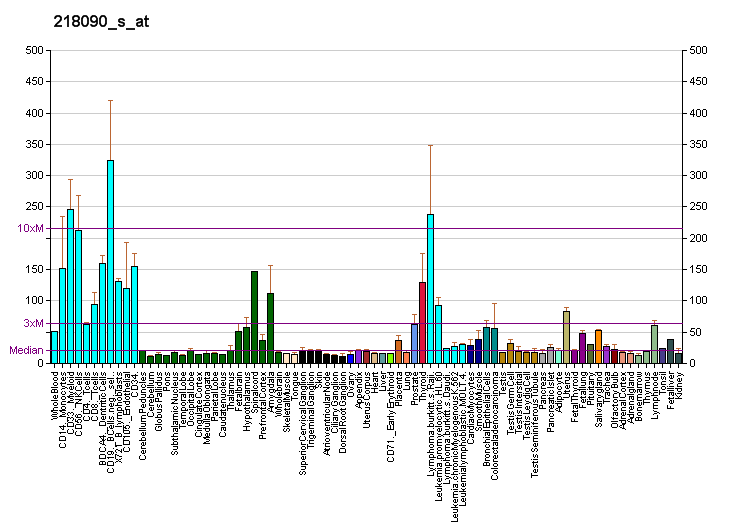
RNA expression pattern
Bgee	Human / Mouse (ortholog); Top expressed in: epithelium of nasopharynx; Achilles tendon; Epithelium of choroid plexus; germinal epithelium; oocyte; visceral pleura; monocyte; secondary oocyte; right uterine tube; parietal pleura / Top expressed in: retinal pigment epithelium; ciliary body; Paneth cell; superior cervical ganglion; medullary collecting duct; renal corpuscle; hand; otolith organ; utricle; interventricular septum; More reference expression data
BioGPS	More reference expression data
Gene ontology
Molecular function	protein binding
Cellular component	lysosomal membrane; nucleus; microtubule cytoskeleton; integral component of membrane; cytoplasm; membrane; cytosol; Golgi apparatus; trans-Golgi network; cytoskeleton; axoneme; cytoplasmic vesicle; ciliary basal body; cell projection
Biological process	intracellular protein transport; development of the heart; regulation of smoothened signaling pathway; multicellular organism growth; cilium assembly; head development; vesicle tethering to Golgi
Sources:Amigo / QuickGO
Orthologs
Databases	NCBI: entry; OMA: entry
Species	Human	Mouse
Entrez	55717	207425
Ensembl	ENSG00000120008	ENSMUSG00000042055
UniProt	Q9BZH6	Q8K1X1
RefSeq (mRNA)	NM_018117	NM_172255
RefSeq (protein)	NP_060587	NP_758459
Location (UCSC)	Chr 10: 120.85 – 120.91 Mb	Chr 7: 129.19 – 129.24 Mb
PubMed search
- Wikidata
View/Edit Human	View/Edit Mouse

WD repeat-containing protein 11 (WDR11) also known as bromodomain and WD repeat-containing protein 2 (BRWD2) is a protein that in humans is encoded by the WDR11 gene.

== Function ==
This gene encodes a member of the WD repeat protein family. WD repeats are minimally conserved regions of approximately 40 amino acids typically bracketed by gly-his and trp-asp (GH-WD), which may facilitate formation of heterotrimeric or multiprotein complexes. WDR11 has been shown to be part of a trimer with FAM91A1 (Family With Sequence Similarity 91 Member A1) and C17orf75, as elicited through immunoprecipitation, fractionation, and mass spectrometry. This trimer has been proposed to promote the Golgi’s capture of vesicles. Members of this family are involved in a variety of cellular processes, including cell cycle progression, signal transduction, apoptosis, and gene regulation.

== Clinical significance ==
This gene is located in the chromosome 10q25-26 region, which is frequently deleted in gliomas and tumors of other tissues, and is disrupted by the t(10;19) translocation rearrangement in glioblastoma cells. The gene location suggests that it is a candidate gene for the tumor suppressor locus.
