= Endometriosis and infertility =

Disease complication

Endometriosis and its complications are a major cause of female infertility. Endometriosis is a dysfunction characterized by the migration of endometrial tissue to areas outside of the endometrium of the uterus. The most common places to find stray tissue are on ovaries and fallopian tubes, followed by other organs in the lower abdominal cavity such as the bladder and intestines. Typically, the endometrial tissue adheres to the exteriors of the organs, and then creates attachments of scar tissue called adhesions that can join adjacent organs together. The endometrial tissue and the adhesions can block a fallopian tube and prevent the meeting of ovum and sperm cells, or otherwise interfere with fertilization, implantation and, rarely, the carrying of the fetus to term.

Endometriosis is estimated to occur in 7% to 10% of women, with an associated risk of infertility for between 30% and 50% of this population. Endometriosis is commonly classified under the revised American Society for Reproductive Medicine system from minimal endometriosis to severe endometriosis. The therapy and management of endometriosis for infertility is based on the severity of endometriosis.

== Diagnosis and classification ==
Endometriosis often presents with a very diverse array of symptoms, such as dysmenorrhea (pain during menstruation), cyclical pelvic pain (generalized pain in the lower abdomen that predictably worsens with menstruation), dyspareunia (pain during intercourse), or infertility (inability to achieve a pregnancy with unprotected intercourse for > 1 year). One suggested pathophysiologic mechanism involves retrograde menstruation and endometrial interactions with peritoneal inflammatory cytokines that promote ectopic implantation and growth of endometrial tissue outside of the uterus. Most women experience this phenomenon during normal cycles, rendering many susceptible to endometriosis. Up to 4.1% of women undergoing tubal ligation surgeries have visually apparent, but clinically asymptomatic endometrial implantations. The poor correlation between extent of ectopic implantation to symptom severity makes early detection and intervention challenging. Women in which the presenting symptom is infertility often have diagnoses delayed beyond the average window of 25–29 years of age.

The gold standard for diagnosing endometriosis is a diagnostic laparoscopy, a minimally invasive procedure that involves a camera entering the abdominals through a small incision to examine the abdominal cavity for the presence of endometriotic tissue outside of the uterus. Suspect lesions may be further examined microscopically for confirmation, before being classified as:

- Superficial Endometriosis: adhesions are limited to organ surfaces (< 5mm)
- Deeply Infiltrating Endometriosis (DIE): endometriotic tissue infiltrate into the retroperitoneal space for 5mm or more

Upon diagnosis of endometriosis, there are also several classification systems to rate the prognosis. Currently, revised American Society for Reproductive Medicine (rASRM) classification is the most globally accepted and widely used system for the classification of endometriosis. It uses a weighted scoring system, in which values are assigned according to the size and severity of endometriotic adhesions in the ovaries, peritoneum, and fallopian tube. The cumulative score is then ranked as:

- Stage I (minimal): 1-5
  - Isolated implants without notable adhesions
- Stage II (mild): 6-15
  - Scattered implants (size < 5 cm) on the peritoneum and ovaries, without notable adhesions
- Stage III (moderate): 16-40
  - Presence of both superficial and deeply infiltrating, with the addition of ovarian and tubal adhesions
- Stage IV (severe): > 40
  - Extensive superficial and deep implants, dense adhesions, and notably large endometriomas (endometrial tissue growing on the ovaries)

Despite being the preferred staging system, each successive stage does not accurately predict the severity of pain an individual will experience or infertility. In fact, there was no difference in observed fertility rates following use of assisted reproductive technology (ART) across rASRM stages. To more accurately predict infertility rates, the development of the Endometriosis Fertility Index (EFI) was proposed in 2010.

Used in conjunction with rASRM, EFI functional scores incorporate patient characteristics to strengthen predictions of infertility, such as age, duration of infertility, and history of prior pregnancy. With 5 possible points derived from surgical findings and 5 possible points from patient characteristics, EFI functional scores range from 0 (worst prognosis, lowest probability of natural pregnancy) to 10 (best prognosis, highest probability of natural pregnancy). Currently, EFI remains the only validated classification system that predicts pregnancy outcomes for patients following laparoscopy for endometriosis. EFI staging is performed as follows:

Endometriosis Fertility Index (EFI):

- Historical Factors:
  - Age (≤ 35 years, 36–39 years, ≥ 40 years)
  - Years of infertility (≤ 3 years, > 3 years)
  - Prior pregnancy (yes or no)
- Surgical Factors:
  - Least function (LF) score (estimating function of fallopian tubes, fimbriae, and ovaries)
  - AFS endometriosis score
  - AFS total score

Estimated percent pregnant using ART by EFI score:

- EFI Score 9-10: 75%
- EFI Score 7-8: 65%
- EFI Score 6: 55%
- EFI Score 4: 24%
- EFI Score 0-3: 10%

Predicted pregnancy rates by EFI is dependent on functional ova and sperm of both parents, as well as the absence of uterine structural of functional abnormalities. While initial development of this fertility grading score took into account the use of ART (assisted reproductive technology), subsequent studies have shown the scale holds true in the setting of natural forms of conception, such as timed intercourse with ovulation, regardless of ovulation induction methods. When observed over longer periods of time, estimated probabilities for pregnancy were more favorable than originally suggested; therefore, the EFI score likely offers the lower end of fertility expectations and may be used to decide between use of ART or natural methods for conception.

== Mechanism ==
The mechanisms by which endometriosis may cause infertility are not clearly understood, particularly when the extent of endometriosis is low. Proposed mechanisms involve an interplay of genes, hormones, inflammatory and immune mediators. Some examples of pathways are:

- Retrograde menstruation. In the normal menstrual cycle, the blood goes down the cervix to the vagina. Sometimes, part of this menstruation can go through the tubes and get out the abdominal cavity, and cause a cyst of endometriosis.
- Cell metaplasia. The transformation of cells into endometrial tissue.
- Anatomical distortions and adhesions (the fibrous bands that form between tissues and organs following recovery from an injury) impair oocyte production and ovulation, decrease sperm motility, and lead to disordered myometrial contractions that can affect fertilization and embryo transport. Increased levels of adhesion molecules have been found in serum of women with endometriosis. These molecules include VCAM-1, ICAM-1, metalloproteinases, MMP-2, MMP-3, MMP-7, and MMP-9.
- Advanced stages of endometriosis and, in particular, cases of endometriomas where the endometrial tissue growing in and around the ovary can cause reduction of the ovarian reserve. One proposed mechanism of this pathway is that toxic products secreted from the endometrioma may have detrimental effects on maintenance of oocytes, compromising their viability.
- The release of factors from endometriotic cysts which are detrimental to gametes and affect sperm function. An endometriotic cyst contains free iron, reactive oxygen species, proteolytic enzymes and inflammatory molecules. Follicular density in tissue surrounding the endometriotic cyst has been consistently shown to be significantly lower than in healthy ovaries, and to a degree that does not appear to be caused merely by the stretching of surrounding tissues owing to the presence of a cyst.
- Women with endometriosis show an increase in inflammatory markers in their peritoneal fluid, specifically within the pelvic area. Altered peritoneal fluid that surrounds ovaries can have oxidative DNA damage to oocytes and be harmful to an embryo. Furthermore, increased levels of circulating cytokines and chemokines can contribute to an overall inflammatory state. Some of these cytokines include interleukin-1β, interleukin-6, tumor necrosis factor, monocyte chemoattractant protein 1, and RANTES. This chronic inflammatory state can lead to fibrosis that is a commonly seen in endometriosis, often presenting as adhesions.
- 43% of women with tubal endometriosis also have hydrosalpinx or haematosalpinx, primarily hydrosalpinx, a condition when one of the fallopian tubes is blocked and fills with an inflammatory, embryo-toxic fluid.
- Epigenetic alterations of the aromatase-encoding gene (CYP19A1) may cause deregulation in cumulus cells in infertile women with endometriosis, leading to altered ovarian follicles and impaired oocyte quality.

For other unknown reasons, endometriosis is more likely to develop in infertile women, and thus be a secondary phenomenon. It is preferable to speak of "endometriosis-associated infertility" rather than any definite "infertility caused by endometriosis" because association does not imply causation.

== Management ==
=== Medication ===
In addition to pain control, medical management of endometriosis targets the suppression of hormonally active endometriotic tissue. Standard pharmacotherapy for women diagnosed with endometriosis include:

- Analgesics (eg non-steroidal anti-inflammatory drugs (NSAIDs) or acetaminophen)
- Oral contraceptive pills
- Androgenic agents (eg danazol)
- Progestogens (eg medroxyprogesterone acetate)
- Gonadotropin releasing hormone analogues (GnRHas)
- Anti-progestogens (eg gestrinone)

Other than the analgesics, all these medications attempt to suppress follicle growth, induce amenorrhea, and suppress endometriotic lesions to improve fertility. However, as many of these therapies have contraceptive effects, they are not ideal for women seeking fertility. Instead, they postpone pregnancy and imply side effects.

A second strategy is to stimulate follicle growth and ovulation. Clomiphene citrate, both alone or in combination with gonadotropins, is the most commonly prescribed. Aromatase inhibitors have also been used for follicle stimulation, but their efficacy have not been isolated.

Immunomodulators such as interferon alpha 2 (IFN-α 2) and tumor necrosis factor (TNF)-α inhibitors are being studied in women with severe endometriosis. A study that included nineteen women received Etanercept before an IVF cycle showed a higher pregnancy rate compared to women who were not treated. Further studies still need to be done in order to determine the risk of infectious adverse events.

=== Surgery ===
Surgical intervention of endometriosis is indicated for both diagnostic and therapeutic purposes. It can be utilized for the diagnosis and treatment of endometriotic adhesions, as a second-line treatment following the failure or intolerance of pharmacotherapy, or for treatment of infertility in some patients.

The goal of surgical intervention in mild endometriosis is to destroy or remove endometriotic implants, which has been shown to successfully improve fertility. Possible types of surgeries include excision, electrodiathermy, or laser.

The goal of surgical intervention in moderate/severe endometriosis is not only to remove large endometriomas, but also to restore the normal anatomy of the pelvis. However, there are no RCTs comparing these surgeries with medical or non-treatment options. Ideally, surgery would be performed to diagnose while simultaneously treating. This can minimize exposure to multiple surgeries. In cases of severe endometriosis, lesions may or may not be limited to the pelvic area, and may require advanced ultrasound in order to create a more accurate surgical plan.

Compared to hormonal suppression, surgery is more effective at treating infertility in women who suffer from endometriosis, especially for women with mild to moderate endometriosis. While surgery can enhance the chances of conceiving naturally during the 12-18 ensuing months, the removal of ovarian endometriomas may be more risky and cause potential harm on future reproductive success. For this reason, there are certain criteria that a surgeon must take into account beforehand in order to have minimal effect on ovarian reserve. Bilateral versus unilateral cystectomy of endometriomas can reduce ovarian reserve, as well as recurrent endometrioma excisions. Combination of surgery and postoperative hormonal suppression therapy can also reduce the risk of recurring lesions and pain symptoms.

Laparoscopic excision of minimal (rASRM Stage I) endometriomas has been shown to have better health outcomes including shorter postoperative recovery times, shorter hospital stays and decreased hospital costs compared to other endometriosis-associated surgeries. However, the preferred surgical procedure (laparoscopy versus drainage and ablation) has insufficient comparative evidence to guide women planning to have postoperative fertility treatments.

Evidence has shown that preexisting hydrosalpinx is associated with lower fertility rates and reduced success rates for assisted reproductive technologies, the decline attributed to embryotoxic components in the hydrosalpinx fluid. If the hydrosalpinx is significant, it is often recommended to remove the afflicted fallopian tube, preventing such fluid from entering the uterus where it would likely kill any embryo produced by the remaining fallopian tube or by assistive IVF. Hydrosalpinx treatment increases the likelihood of pregnancy, regardless of the treatment modality used. Salpingectomy has been associated with higher rates of clinical pregnancies, implantations and IVF live births, versus other hydrosalpinx treatments.

=== Intrauterine insemination ===
In women with minimal to mild endometriosis, as defined by the American Society for Reproductive Medicine, intrauterine insemination is the preferred treatment; however, the effects are modest if used as a monotherapy. The use of fertility medication that stimulates ovulation (clomiphene citrate, gonadotropins) combined with intrauterine insemination (IUI) enhances fertility in this population as does assisted reproduction.

IUI is not given to women with moderate to severe endometriosis due to damage and scarring of the fallopian tubes associated with endometriosis.

=== In vitro fertilization ===
In-vitro fertilization (IVF) procedures are effective in improving fertility in many women with endometriosis, especially in those who experience severe endometriosis. Discounting those with damage to the oocytes and embryos, IVF procedures have yielded similar results in increasing fertility among both women with and without endometriosis. IVF makes it possible to combine sperm and eggs in a laboratory and then place the resulting embryos into the uterus. The decision when to apply IVF in endometriosis-associated infertility cases takes into account the age of the individual, severity of the endometriosis, presence of other infertility factors, and the results and duration of past treatments. In ovarian hyperstimulation as part of IVF for women with endometriosis, using a standard GnRH agonist protocol has been found to be equally effective in regard to using a GnRH antagonist protocol in terms of pregnancy rate. On the other hand, when using a GnRH agonist protocol, long-term (three to six months) pituitary down-regulation before IVF for those with endometriosis has been estimated to increase the odds of clinical pregnancy by fourfold.

No difference has been found between surgery (cystectomy or aspiration) versus expectant management, or between ablation versus cystectomy, prior to IVF in women with endometriosis.

Utilizing IVF procedures prior to endometriosis-associated surgery has not been shown to enhance fertility compared to utilizing IVF procedures post-surgery.

== Epidemiology ==
Specific risk factors are still undetermined; however, genetic and environmental factors have been found to be associated with endometriosis, with genetic risk factors accounting for about 51% of endometriosis cases. Genetic risk factors associated with endometriosis include:

- Earlier menarche (≤11 years of age)
- Short menstrual cycles (≤27 days)
- Higher follicular-phase estradiol levels in taller women
- Lower BMI
- First-degree relative with endometriosis

Environmental risk factors include:

- exposure to ovarian hormones.

Early life risk factors found correlated with increased risk for endometriosis include:

- low birth weight (under 2.5 kg or 5.5 lbs).

Higher physical activity levels and a diet with omega-3 fatty acids may reduce inflammatory markers, and decrease the risk of endometriosis.
