= FNDC9 =

Gene on human chromosome 5

Identifiers
- Aliases: FNDC9, C5orf40, fibronectin type III domain containing 9
- External IDs: MGI: 2443410; GeneCards: FNDC9

Gene location (Human)
Chr.	Chromosome 5 (human)
Band	5q33.3	Start	157,341,598 bp
Band	5q33.3	End	157,345,677 bp

Gene location (Mouse)
Chr.	Chromosome 11 (mouse)
Band	11|11 B1.1	Start	46,126,358 bp
Band	11|11 B1.1	End	46,130,699 bp
RNA expression pattern
Bgee	Human / Mouse (ortholog); Top expressed in: nucleus accumbens; superior frontal gyrus; hypothalamus; pituitary gland; Brodmann area 9; cerebellum; cerebellar hemisphere; prefrontal cortex; primary visual cortex; right frontal lobe / Top expressed in: esophagus; supraoptic nucleus; lip; granulocyte; skin of back; habenula; arcuate nucleus; blastocyst; median eminence; skin of external ear; More reference expression data
BioGPS	n/a
Orthologs
Databases	NCBI: entry; OMA: entry
Species	Human	Mouse
Entrez	408263	320116
Ensembl	ENSG00000172568	ENSMUSG00000048721
UniProt	Q8TBE3	Q8BJN4
RefSeq (mRNA)	NM_001001343	NM_177075
RefSeq (protein)	NP_001001343	NP_796049
Location (UCSC)	Chr 5: 157.34 – 157.35 Mb	Chr 11: 46.13 – 46.13 Mb
PubMed search
- Wikidata
View/Edit Human	View/Edit Mouse

Fibronectin type III domain–containing protein 9 (FNDC9) is a protein which in humans is encoded by the FNDC9 gene. FNDC9 is a single-pass membrane-associated protein. The protein is expressed across multiple human tissues and appears to play roles in cell signaling and membrane-associated processes.

Fibronectin type III domain-containing protein 9
- Symbol: FNDC9
- NCBI Gene: 408263
- GeneCard: MGC27121
- UniProt: Q8TBE3
- RefSeq: NM_001001343.4
- Locus: chromosome 5q33.3

== Gene ==
FNDC9 is located on the negative strand of human chromosome 5. It is organized into 2 exons forming a single major protein-coding transcript.

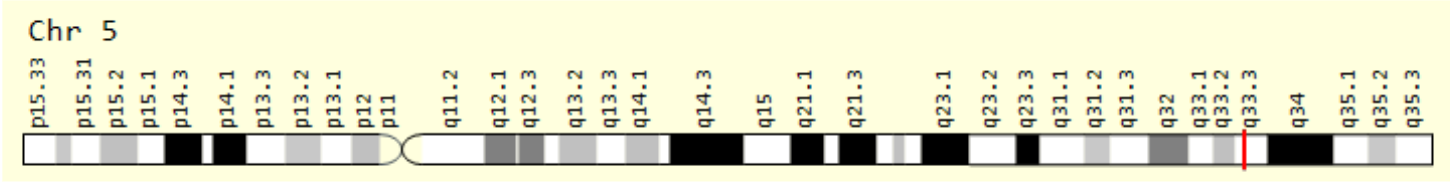
Figure 1: Chromosome 5 with gene FNDC9 labeled.

=== Expression ===
Bases on human tissue GEO profile and RNA-seq datasets, FNDC9 shows the highest expression in brain regions, including cortex, cerebellum, and hypothalamus, suggesting potential roles in neural development or signaling.

Reduced expression of FNDC9 in aggressive tumor contexts raises the possibility that FNDC9 contributes to maintaining structural or signaling homeostasis in healthy tissues.

=== mRNA ===
The mRNA has 2083 base pairs. There are no isoforms of FNDC9.

=== Conceptual translation ===
The depicted conceptual translation contains the 5'UTR , protein sequence, and the end of the 3'UTR region.

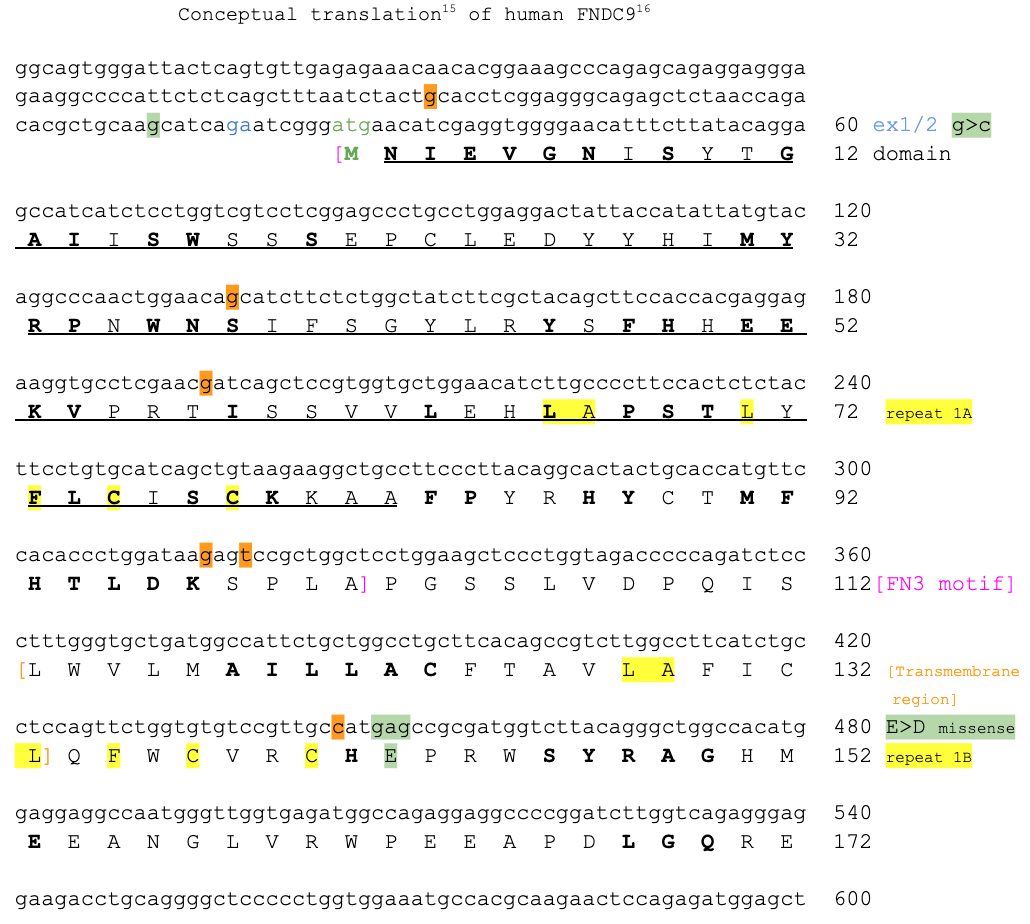

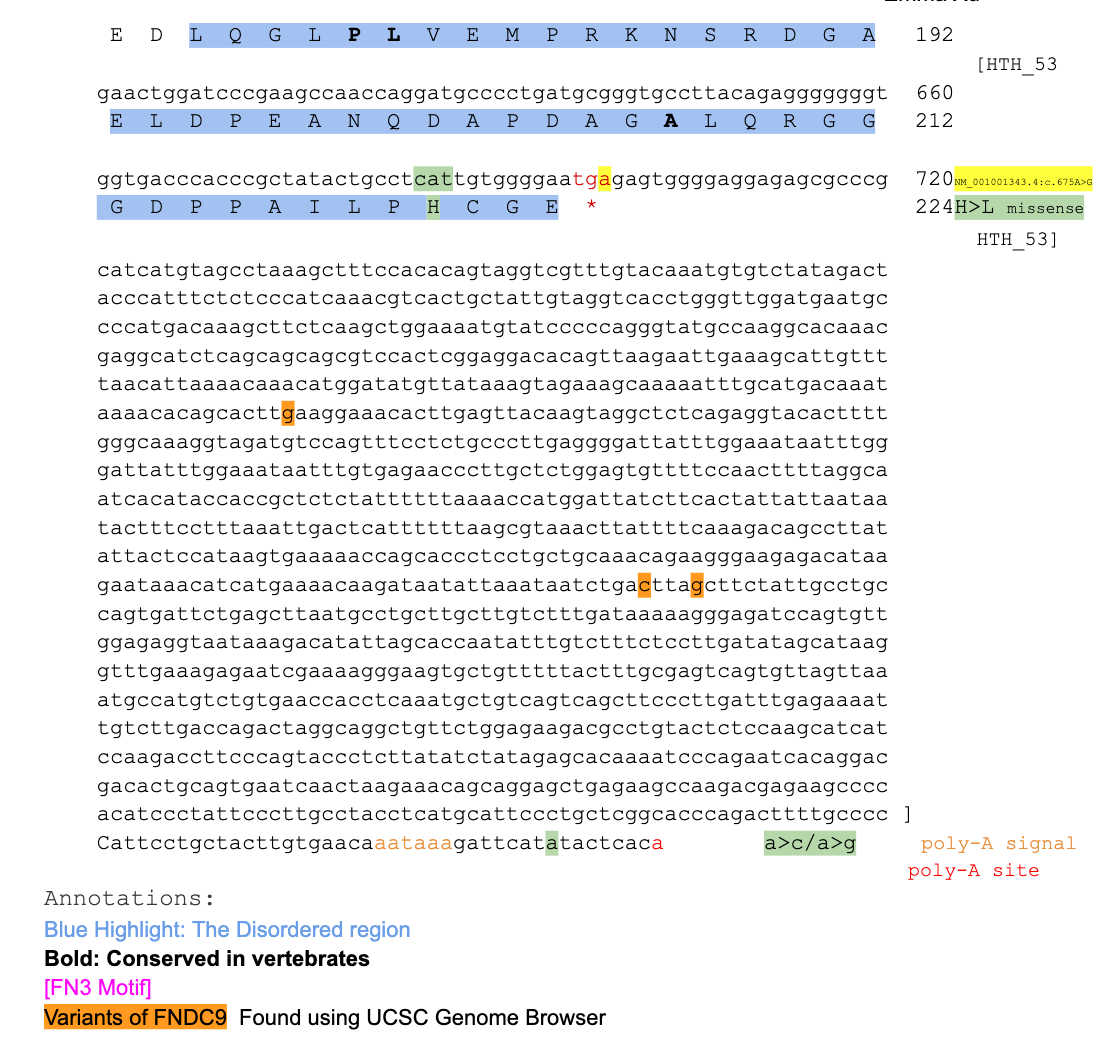
Figure 2: Conceptual Translation of Human Gene FNDC9

== Protein ==
FNDC9 protein contains 224 amino acid and with molecular mass ~25kDa. It has a theoretical pI of ~5.31, indicating that at physiological pH it will be overall acidic, carrying a net negative charge.

=== Structure ===
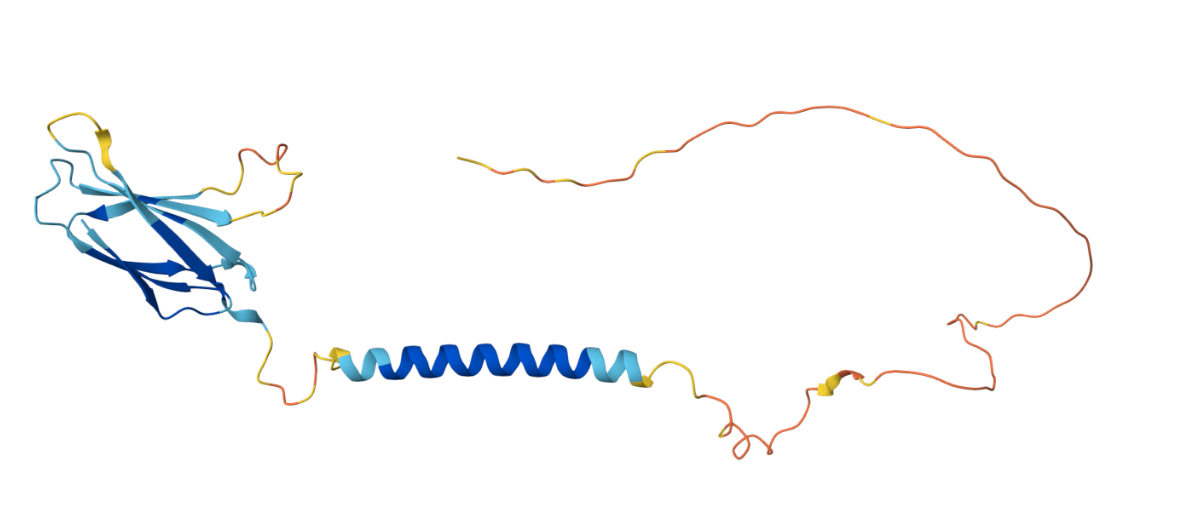
Figure 3: FNDC9 tertiary structure generated by AlphaFold

The primary structure of human FNDC9 protein contains a signal peptide at the N-terminus, followed by a conserved fibronectin type III (FN3) domain. Approximately between residues 110–130, FNDC9 includes a single-pass transmembrane helix.

Secondary structure predictions indicate that FNDC9 contains ~64% α-helix and ~56% β-strand, along with roughly 10% turns.

At the tertiary level, the N-terminal FN3 domain adopts a β-sandwich fold, and the central portion forms a single α-helical membrane-spanning segment.The C-terminal region is intrinsically disordered.

=== Protein localization and abundance ===
DeepLoc and PSORT II predict strong enrichment at the cell membrane, with one transmembrane helix supporting membrane insertion. AlphaFold and secondary structure modeling show an extracellular N-terminal domain and a cytoplasmic C-terminal tail, consistent with type I membrane topology.

=== Post translational modification ===
FNDC9 has multiple significant domains and regions throughout the protein sequence, including a disordered region, a FN3 region/motif, and a transmembrane region. ExPASypredicted post-translational modifications include phosphorylation sites in the C-terminal region and one extracellular N-glycosylation motif:

- Phosphorylation: NetPhos predictes some phosphorylation sites are predominantly located in the intracellular C-terminal region.
- Glycosylation: FNDC9 contains one predicted N-glycosylation motif (N-X-S/T) within the extracellular domain.

== Evolutionary history ==
=== Orthologs ===
There are many orthologs of Fibronectin type III domain–containing protein 9, both strict and distant, but there are no paralogs. FNDC9 is estimate to have first appeared in fish more than462 years ago. It is found in vertebrates, but it is not found in invertebrates. The following table presents some of the orthologs found using BLAST. and EMBOSS NEEDLE Ortholog identity generally decreases with increasing evolutionary distance.

FNDC9	Genus	Common name	Taxonomic	Date of divergence (MYA)	Accession number	Sequence length(aa)	Sequence identity%	Similarity%
Mammal	Homo sapiens	Human	Primates	0	NP_001001343.2	224	100	100
	Nomascus leucogenys	Northern White-Cheeked Gibbon	Primates	19.5	XP_030681792	224	98.2	99.6
	Sus scrofa	Pig	Artiodactyla	94	XP_020932357.1	260	85.3	89.2
	Mus musculus	Mouse	Rodentia	87	NP_796049.1	226	84.1	88.5
	Miniopterus natalensis	Natal Long-Fingered Bat	Chiroptera	94	XP_006863986.1	222	86.6	92
	Physeter macrocephalus	Sperm Whale	Cetacea	94	XP_007115492.2	278	86	88.2
	Antechinus flavipes	Yellow-Footed Antechinus	Dasyuromorphia	160	XP_051834756.1	219	60.9	74.2
Aves	Gallus gallus	Chicken	Galliformes	319	XP_015149385.3	220	40.3	58
	Egretta garzetta	Little Egret	Pelecaniformes	319	XP_009632999.2	266	44.7	61.5
	Tyto alba	Common Barn Owl	Strigiformes	319	XP_042644886.1	218	44.6	43.1
Amphibians	Anomaloglossus baeobatrachus	Guiana Rocket Frog	Anura	352	XP_075190430	224	42.1	48.1
	Rhinatrema bivittatum	Two-lined Caecilian	Gymnophiona	352	XP_029439482	218	39.5	51.5
	Ambystoma mexicanum	Axolotl	Urodela	352	XP_069487805	225	31.5	49.5
	Xenopus tropicalis	Western Clawed Frog	Anura	352	NP_004911868.1	226	25.9	42.9
Fishes	Salarias fasciatus	Jewelled Blenny	Blenniiformes	429	XP_029938680.1	211	31.8	45.3
	Erpetoichthys calabaricus	Reed Fish	Perciformes	429	XP_051790191.1	215	31.3	48.1
	Callorhinchus milii	Elephant Shark	Polypteriformes	462	XP_007891030	226	34.7	47.9
	Etheostoma spectabile	Orangethroat Darter	Polypteriformes	429	XP_032382694.1	208	31.1	44.4
	Polypterus senegalus	Gray Bichir	Chimaeriformes	429	XP_039608718.1	225	31.8	43.9
	Chiloscyllium plagiosum	Whitespotted Bamboo Shark	Orectolobiformes	462	XP_043556121	224	30.2	41.7

=== Rate of divergence ===
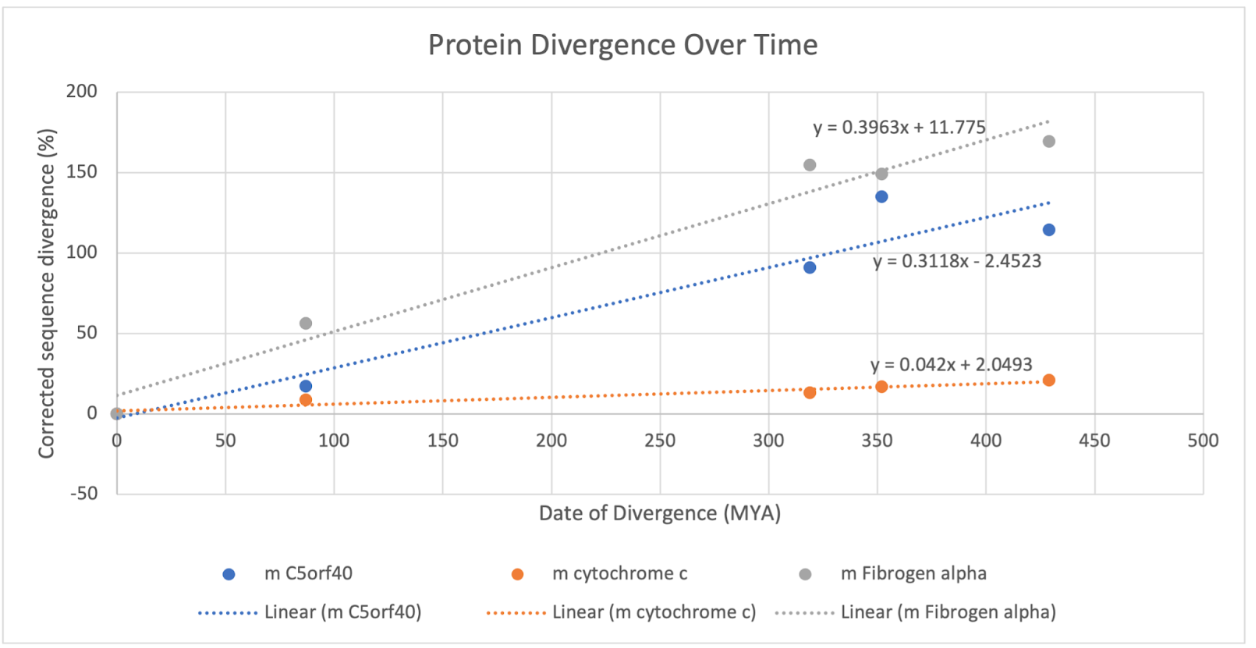
Figure 5: The line chart illustrates the protein sequences change over time by comparing the corrected sequence divergence with the estimated date of divergence. Each line represents a different protein—C5orf40 (blue), Cytochrome c (orange), and Fibrinogen alpha (gray). The data are from human, mouse, chicken, frog and jewelled blenny (fish).

The increasing corrected sequence divergence with greater evolutionary distance reflects how FNDC9 has gradually diverged since the common ancestor of vertebrates around 430–460 million years ago. Like in Figure 5, FNDC9 evolves faster than highly conserved proteins such as Cytochrome C but slower than rapidly changing proteins like Fibrinogen alpha.

== Function ==
=== Protein interaction ===
Many proteins have been found to interact with FNDC9. STRING predicts five potential functional partners for FNDC9. Description are depicted in the table below.

Abbrev.	Full Name	Basis of Interaction	Score	Biological Function
PROKR2	Prokineticin receptor 2	STRING: co-expression, curated literature co-mention; low experimental score	0.591	GPCR involved in neuroendocrine signaling; activates PLC, Ca²⁺ release, and MAPK pathways.
SMIM28	Small integral membrane protein 28	STRING: Co-Mentioned in Pubmed Abstracts	0.582	Poorly characterized single-pass membrane protein; possible role in cell communication.
VWA3A	Von Willebrand factor A domain–containing protein 3A	STRING: predicted functional partner (text mining + homology)	0.444	ECM-associated adhesion-related protein, domain often used in protein–protein recognition.
ANKFN1	Ankyrin repeat and fibronectin type III domain–containing protein 1	STRING: Co-Mentioned in Pubmed Abstracts	0.429	Scaffolding protein containing ankyrin repeats; may mediate protein complexes at membranes.
FANK1	Fibronectin type 3 and ankyrin repeat domains protein 1	STRING: Co-Mentioned in Pubmed Abstracts	0.406	Reported in apoptosis regulation and transcription factor activation.

== Clinical significance ==
Some studies occasionally highlight FNDC9 as part of loci associated with neurological and metabolic traits, though without functional validation. In a study of neuroblastoma, FNDC9 was among the genes downregulated in aggressive tumors, associated with extracellular matrix (ECM) organization and neural functions. Because ECM remodeling is often critical to tumor invasion and metastasis, FNDC9’s altered expression may contribute to tumor behavior in the nervous system or related tissues. In computational analyses, FNDC9 has been noted to exhibit altered regulation during skeletal muscle differentiation, particularly in experiments manipulating PPARγ expression in myoblasts. This suggests a possible role in tissue development or maintenance.

Although FNDC9 contains several annotated SNPs in genomic databases, no specific human diseases have been definitively linked to this gene. The association of FNDC9 with proteins involved in neuroendocrine signaling (PROKR2), apoptosis (FANK1), and cellular adhesion (VWA3A) suggests possible roles in these biological pathways.
