= Global Entrepreneurs Network =

- Company type: Private company
- Industry: Internet services
- Founded: 1994
- Founder: Thomas Heimann
- Defunct: 1998
- Fate: Acquired
- Successor: Sage networks (which later became Interliant Corporation)
- Headquarters: Tampa, Florida, United States
- Area served: United States
- Products: Web hosting service, domain name registration service
- Website: home.gen.com Archived December 2, 1998, at the Wayback Machine

Global Entrepreneurs Network (GEN or GLOBALENET) was an American internet company that was the world's first web hosting and e-commerce hosting provider. The company was based in Tampa, Florida and was founded by Thomas Heimann in 1994. It operated until late 1998 when it was acquired by Sage networks (which later became Interliant Corporation).

During the time it operated, the company invented the email autoresponder in 1995 and was the first online web-based free domain name registration service.

== History ==
=== Early history ===
Thomas Heimann was an early online entrepreneur marketing his "Computer Profits" and "All-in-One Electronic Marketing Kit" which were two products that taught entrepreneurs how to use Usenet newsgroups for online marketing. He came to the realization that the World Wide Web would become the "Great Equalizer" and de facto platform for online commerce. In his attempts to set up a web presence for his own marketing business he realized that the few companies that were selling web servers and offering web related services to businesses at the time were simply too expensive for entrepreneurs and small businesses, with the least expensive solution cobbled together at the time costing in excess of $5,000.00.

In late 1994 Thomas met (online) Rich Skrenta, an engineer with Novel at the time, and the two discussed what it would take to provide simple web hosting and email solutions, as well as domain registration services, and the two reached an arrangement that gave birth to the Global Entrepreneurs Network (GEN). GEN – using the initial domain of Entrepreneurs.net – purchased a Unix server to be hosted by Skrenta in his basement, and GEN would pay Skrenta a one-time fee of $50 for every domain registered and account set up on the server. Skrenta wrote a number of Perl scripts to automate domain registration and account setup, and GEN officially opened doors as a membership organization offering two membership plans: Standard Membership at $49/month or $249/year and full-service membership at $99/month or $895/year. Each membership plan included a domain registration, with 5 email addresses and a 5 MB website for standard members and unlimited email addresses and 100 MB website for full-service members.

Since the domain registration process at the time was entirely free, GEN became the first company to offer free domain registration via a web-based order form that in turn connected to the scripts Skrenta created to automate the registration process with InterNIC.

Originally GEN was started in Heimann's two-bedroom apartment with a handful of early day employees, most of which worked 'practically free' just for the excitement of being part of something "big". In late 1995 GEN was able to secure a sublease at below market rates for class A office space at 100 N Tampa Street in downtown Tampa, where the company would remain for the next two years.

=== Growth and expansion ===
In 1995 GEN hired Raymond Karrenbauer, who became instrumental in designing the first Microsoft IIS-based web server farm, which was a strategic decision that led to GEN becoming the first web hosting provider to offer Microsoft FrontPage hosting in 1996 upon Microsoft's launch of the product, with its $9.95/month Start Smart Frontpage hosting plan.

In 1996 GEN reached an agreement with America Online (AOL) and created an 'All in One' eBusiness CD ROM that provided Internet access via AOL, combined with online signup for GEN's hosting services and MS FrontPage software. GEN would introduce the eBusiness CD ROM and its various other programs at the 2007 CeBIT in Hannover, Germany.

In 1998 GEN reached an agreement with iMall, at the time the leading provider of online mall services, and CardService to facilitate online storefronts and credit card processing for its full-service membership customers.

=== End of the business 1998 ===
GEN was at the time the world's largest web hosting and ecommerce provider, with over 35,000 customers and domains hosted in over 50 countries. GEN maintained offices in Cologne, Germany, as well as outside of Canberra, Australia, in addition to its Florida headquarters.

In late 1998, GEN International, Inc (GEN - Global Entrepreneurs Network) was acquired and merged with Sage Networks. Sage Networks was later renamed to Interliant, prior to its Initial public offering (IPO).

A late archive of GEN's website can be found at:

== Some of GEN's accomplishments ==
- Invented the email autoresponder in 1995.
- First web-based and free domain registration service.
- During its operation GEN was the largest submitter of domain registrations to InterNIC and provided DNS services to hundreds of thousands of domains.
