= Smoking and infertility =

Smoking and infertility may refer to:

- Smoking and female infertility
- Smoking and male infertility
