= Age and female fertility =

Relationship between getting older and ability to reproduce among females

Female fertility is heavily influenced by age. Fecundity generally remains consistent from a woman's late teens to her early thirties, after which it gradually declines. The rate of decline accelerates after age 35, and by age 45, the natural non-conception rate ranges between 50% and 80%. While menopause, or the permanent cessation of menstrual periods, generally occurs between ages 45 and 55 to signal the end of biological fertility, age-related infertility frequently occurs years prior.

== Quantification of effect ==
Cumulative percentage and average age for women reaching subfertility, sterility, irregular menstruation and menopause.

=== In adolescence ===
The average age of a girl's first period (menarche) is 12 to 13 with regional variations: 12.5 years in the United States, 12.72 in Canada, 12.9 in the UK).

In the first year post-menarche, around 80% of cycles are anovulatory. This declines to 50% in the third year, and to 10% by the sixth. Little is known about fertility in young adolescents, as early teenage pregnancies are uncommon in most societies.

=== In adulthood ===
Female fertility generally peaks between the late teens and late twenties, after which it starts to decline. However, the probability of conception at a specific age varies between sources and is subject to debate.

According to the National Institute for Health and Care Excellence (NICE), over 80% of women aged under 40 who have regular unprotected sexual intercourse will become pregnant within one year of trying. In the second year this percentage rises to over 90%.

A 2004 study by Henri Leridon, PhD, an epidemiologist with the French Institute of Health and Medical Research, of women trying to get pregnant without using fertility drugs or in vitro fertilization, had the following results on rates of conception by age:

- At age 30
  - 75% will have a conception ending in a live birth within one year
  - 91% will have a conception ending in a live birth within four years
- At age 35
  - 66% will have a conception ending in a live birth within one year
  - 84% will have a conception ending in a live birth within four years
- At age 40
  - 44% will have a conception ending in a live birth within one year
  - 64% will have a conception ending in a live birth within four years

According to a study done on a sample of 782 healthy European couples aged 19–39, fertility starts declining after age 27 and drops at a somewhat greater rate after age 35. Statistical analysis showed that the women in the 27–29 age group had a significantly lower chance on average of becoming pregnant than did the 19–26-year-olds. Pregnancy rates did not change notably between the 27–29 age group and the 30–34 age group, but dropped significantly for the 35–39 age group.

The age of the male partner had a significant impact on female fertility among the women who had reached their mid-30s, but not among the younger women. However, experts said the new study was too small and there were many variables that were too difficult to sort out, for a clear conclusion to be drawn. Some experts suggested that the main change in fertility in older women was that it took them longer to conceive, not necessarily that they were significantly less likely to eventually succeed. David Dunson, a biostatistician at the U.S. National Institute of Environmental Health Sciences, said that: "Although we noted a decline in female fertility in the late 20s, what we found was a decrease in the probability of becoming pregnant per menstrual cycle, not in the probability of eventually achieving a pregnancy".

A French study found no difference between the fertility rate of women under 25 and those aged 26–30, after which fertility started to decrease. Estimating the "fertility of a woman" is quite difficult because of the male factor (quality of sperm). This French study looked at 2,193 women who were using artificial insemination because their husbands were azoospermic. The cumulative success rates after 12 cycles of insemination were 73% for women under age 25, 74% in women ages 26–30, 61% for ages 31–35, and 54% in the over 35 age group.

In Hungary, a study by the Központi Statisztikai Hivatal (Central Statistics Office) estimated that 7–12% of Hungarian women younger than 30 were infertile; 13–22% of women age 35 were infertile; and 24–46% of women age 40 were infertile.

The following is a table containing estimates of the percentage of women who will fail to obtain a live birth by the age of the woman when she starts trying to conceive. Note that while for the young ages researchers tend to agree, for older ages there is discrepancy.

Age of woman when she starts to try to conceive	Percentage who will have no live birth						
Age of woman when she starts to try to conceive	according to Vincent (1950)	according to Henry (1953), England	according to Henry (1953), Norway	according to Pittenger (1973)	according to Leridon (1977)	according to Trussell-Wilson (1985)	according to Menken-Larsen (1986)
20	4%	3.5%	3.5%	2.2%	3%	-	4%
25	6%	6%	5%	3.3%	6%	6%	7%
30	10%	11%	8%	6.5%	10%	11%	12%
35	17%	19%	13%	16%	17%	16%	22%
40	37%	33%	24%	40%	29%	24%	46%
45	75%	58%	50%	79%	50%	58%	-

=== Ovarian reserve ===
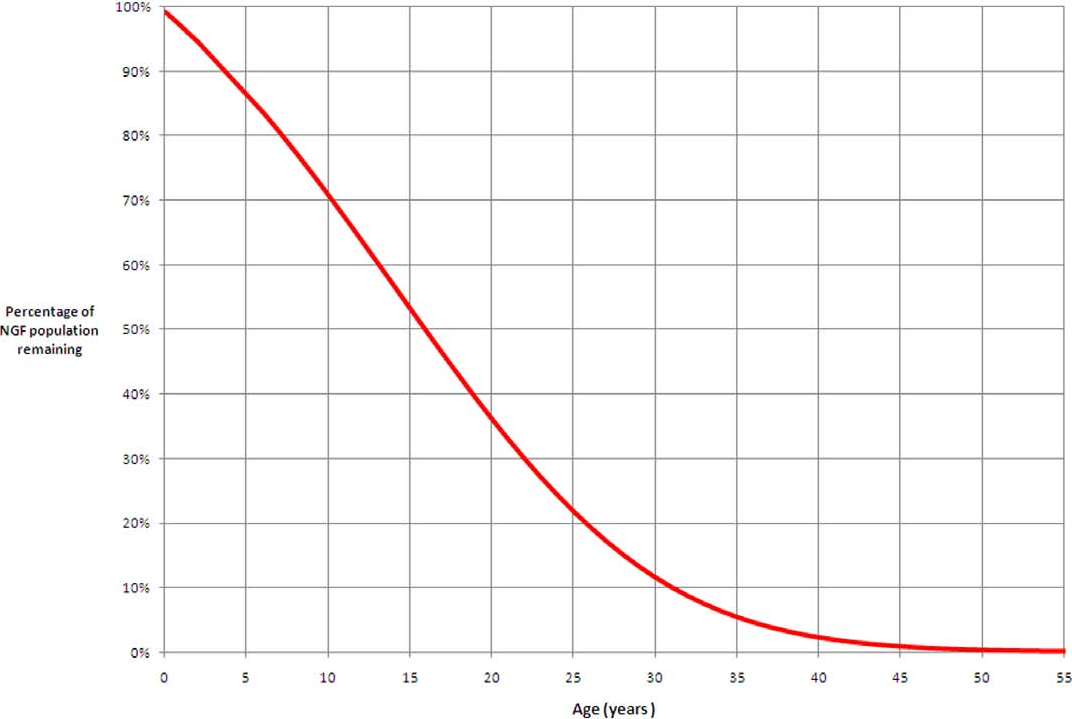
"Percentage of ovarian reserve related to increasing age. The curve describes the percentage of ovarian reserve remaining at ages from birth to 55 years, based on the ADC model. 100% is taken to be the maximum ovarian reserve, occurring at 18–22 weeks post-conception. The percentages apply to all women whose ovarian reserve declines in line with a particular model where late and early menopause are associated with high and low peak NGF populations, respectively. It is estimated that for 95% of women by the age of 30 years only 12% of their maximum pre-birth NGF population is present and by the age of 40 years only 3% remains. At birth, women have all their follicles for folliculogenesis, and they steadily decline until menopause".

In terms of ovarian reserve, a typical woman has 12% of her reserve at age 30 and has only 3% at age 40. 81% of variation in ovarian reserve is due to age alone, making age the most important factor in female infertility.

The most common methods of checking the status of the ovarian reserve are to perform a blood test on day 3 of the menstrual cycle to measure serum follicle-stimulating hormone (FSH) level. Alternatively, a blood test to measure the serum anti-müllerian hormone (AMH) level can give similar information. Transvaginal ultrasound can also be used to "count the number of follicles" and this procedure is called antral Follicle Count.

The American College of Obstetricians and Gynecologists recommends ovarian reserve testing should be performed for women older than 35 years who have not conceived after six months of attempting pregnancy and women at higher risk of diminished ovarian reserve, such as those with a history of cancer treated with gonadotoxic therapy, pelvic irradiation, or both; those with medical conditions that were treated with gonadotoxic therapies; or those who had ovarian surgery for endometriomas.

A poor result from ovarian reserve testing does not signify an absolute inability to conceive and should not be the sole criterion considered to limit or deny access to infertility treatment.

=== Historical data ===
A study of a population of French women from 1670 and 1789 shows that those who married at age 20–24 had 7.0 children on average and 3.7% remained childless. Women who married at age 25–29 years had a mean of 5.7 children and 5.0% remained childless. Women who married at 30–34 years had a mean of 4.0 children and 8.2% remained childless. The average age at last birth in natural fertility populations that have been studied is around 40.

In 1957, a study was done on a large population (American Hutterites) that never used birth control. The investigators measured the relationship between the age of the female partner and fertility. (Infertility rates today are believed to be higher in the general population than for the population in this study from the 1950s.)

This 1957 study found that:

- By age 30, 7% of couples were infertile
- By age 35, 11% of couples were infertile
- By age 40, 33% of couples were infertile
- At age 45, 87% of couples were infertile

== Impact ==
=== Family planning ===
The inverse correlation between age and female fertility in later reproductive life is argued to motivate family planning prior to reaching 35 years of age. The mapping of a woman's ovarian reserve, follicular dynamics and associated biomarkers can give an individual prognosis about future probabilities of pregnancy, thus facilitating an informed choice. Especially since certain hormones can affect natural fertility. Notably, in women aged 30–44 aiming to conceive spontaneously, a higher level of anti-Müllerian hormone (AMH) has been positively correlated with increased fertility post-age related adjustment. Thus, AMH measurements are helpful indicators for the estimation of the length of the fertile window.

=== Reproductive medicine ===
It is recommended that women have an infertility evaluation if they are over the age of 40 and planning to have a child, or if they are older than 35 and have not become pregnant after trying for a minimum of six months. Infertility can be treated with reproductive technologies, which can be discussed with a qualified fertility specialist such as a reproductive endocrinologist.

One such technology is In Vitro Fertilization (IVF), which is an assisted reproductive technology used to treat infertility. While many older women may opt for IVF treatment, patients with higher maternal age (>40 years old) have been found to have worse outcomes and a higher miscarriage rate compared to those aged 20–30. Most IVF centers will attempt to use the patient's own eggs until approximately ages 43–45. Clinically reproductive endocrinologists also tend to pursue IVF more aggressively in women over 35.

Another fertility procedure is Oocyte cryopreservation (egg freezing), which involves the preservation of oocytes by freezing them. These can then be thawed, fertilised, and transferred to the uterus through IVF. This gives women the ability to delay pregnancy while avoiding the infertility issues that arise from germ cell deterioration. Studies show no increased risk of congenital abnormalities in children born from ova that have been cryopreserved, and IVF from thawed eggs has a comparable successful implantation rate to eggs that have never been frozen. While chromosomal abnormalities are avoided with egg freezing, pregnancy at older age increases the risk of gestational diabetes, preeclampsia, preterm labor, and cesarean section regardless of conception method.

However, this field of reproductive technology is still developing and therapeutic interventions to halt or reverse the process of reproductive ageing in women is limited, despite the potential of stem cells which may be used to restore the ovarian reserve.

=== Complications ===
The age of the mother is a risk factor for a number of conditions. Pregnant women over 35 years of age are at increased risk for hypertension during pregnancy, eclampsia (hypertension during pregnancy with seizures), and gestational diabetes. Furthermore, there is also a greater risk for delivery complications, including stillbirth, miscarriage, and complications leading to delivery via caesarean section.

Fetal complications are also high for women of advanced maternal age. One well-known risk is Down syndrome. According to the Academy of Obstetrics and Gynecology, the risk for Down syndrome increases proportionally to maternal age. Other complications in women of advanced maternal age can include cardiac issues, esophageal atresia, hypospadias, and craniosynostosis. Finally, there is also an increased risk for premature birth and babies with low birth weight.

Probability of conceiving a child with Down syndrome according to maternal age by NDSS:

Age of Mother at Birth (years)	Probability
20	1 in 2000
24	1 in 1300
25	1 in 1200
29	1 in 950
30	1 in 900
34	1 in 450
35	1 in 350
39	1 in 150
40	1 in 100
44	1 in 40
45	1 in 30
49	1 in 10

== Ovarian aging ==
The capability to repair DNA strand breaks decreases with age. The repair pathway involves BRCA1 protein (breast cancer type 1 susceptibility protein) and ATM (ataxia–telangiectasia mutated) serine/threonine kinase. The specific DNA repair pathway affected by age is the homologous recombination DNA repair pathway. In general, women with BRCA1 mutations have lower ovarian reserves and experience earlier menopause. In mice, some delay of ovarian aging after treatment was shown.

== See also ==
- Paternal age effect
- Advanced maternal age
