= M33 =

M33, M-33, or M.33 may refer to:

== Roads ==
- M33 (Cape Town), a Metropolitan Route in Cape Town, South Africa
- M33 (Durban), a Metropolitan Route in Durban, South Africa
- M33 (Johannesburg), a Metropolitan Route in Johannesburg, South Africa
- M33 (Pretoria), a Metropolitan Route in Pretoria, South Africa
- M-33 (Michigan highway), a state highway in Michigan, United States

== Military ==
- HMS M33, an M29-class monitor warship of the Royal Navy
- M33 cluster bomb, a Cold War-era U.S. biological cluster bomb
- M33 helmet, used by the Italian Army in World War II
- Miles M.33 Monitor, a 1944 twin engined British target tug aircraft
- M33 ball, a jacketed .50_BMG ammunition cartridge
- M33, US Army rocket launcher for the Honest John rocket

== Other uses ==
- M33 (gene)
- M33 X-7, a black hole binary system in the Triangulum Galaxy
- Macchi M.33, an Italian racing flying boat of 1925
- Messier 33, or Triangulum Galaxy, a galaxy in the Local Group of galaxies
- Mike Tempesta (a.k.a. M.33), a rock guitarist
- Samsung Galaxy M33 5G, an Android-based smartphone
- M33, the postcode district of Sale, a town in Greater Manchester, England
- M33, the type designation of a tram based on Bombardier Flexity Classic at Göteborgs Spårvägar AB, Gothenburg, Sweden

== See also ==
- M33 in Andromeda, a collection of science fiction short stories by A. E. van Vogt
