= Prokineticin receptor =

Protein family

prokineticin receptor 1

Identifiers
- Symbol: PROKR1
- Alt. symbols: GPR73
- NCBI gene: 10887
- HGNC: 4524
- OMIM: 607122
- RefSeq: NM_138964
- UniProt: Q8TCW9

Other data
- Locus: Chr. 2 p14
Search for
- Structures: Swiss-model
- Domains: InterPro

prokineticin receptor 2

Identifiers
- Symbol: PROKR2
- Alt. symbols: GPR73L1
- NCBI gene: 128674
- HGNC: 15836
- OMIM: 607123
- RefSeq: NM_144773
- UniProt: Q8NFJ6

Other data
- Locus: Chr. 20 p12.3
Search for
- Structures: Swiss-model
- Domains: InterPro

The prokineticin receptor is a G protein-coupled receptor which binds the peptide hormone prokineticin. There are two variants each encoded by a different gene (PROKR1, PROKR2). These receptors mediate gastrointestinal smooth muscle contraction and angiogenesis.
