= Prokineticin receptor 1 =

Protein-coding gene in the species Homo sapiens

PROKR1

Identifiers
- Aliases: PROKR1, GPR73, GPR73a, PKR1, ZAQ, prokineticin receptor 1, PK-R1
- External IDs: OMIM: 607122; MGI: 1929676; GeneCards: PROKR1

Gene location (Human)
Chr.	Chromosome 2 (human)
Band	2p13.3	Start	68,643,579 bp
Band	2p13.3	End	68,658,251 bp

Gene location (Mouse)
Chr.	Chromosome 6 (mouse)
Band	6|6 D1	Start	87,555,573 bp
Band	6|6 D1	End	87,567,725 bp
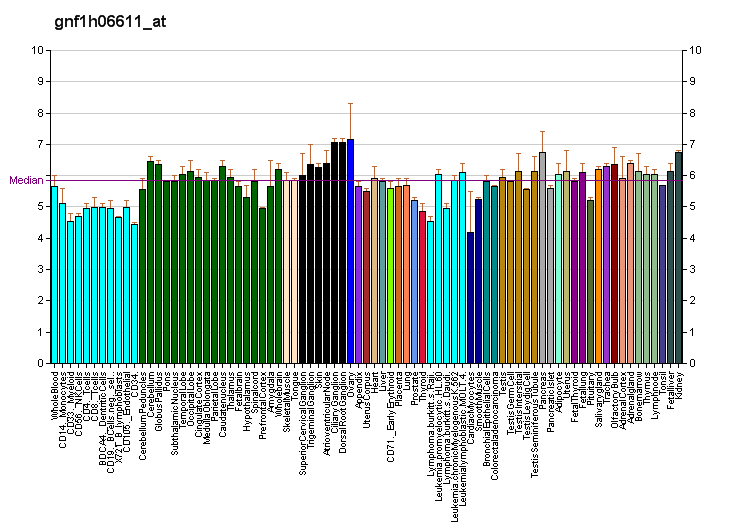

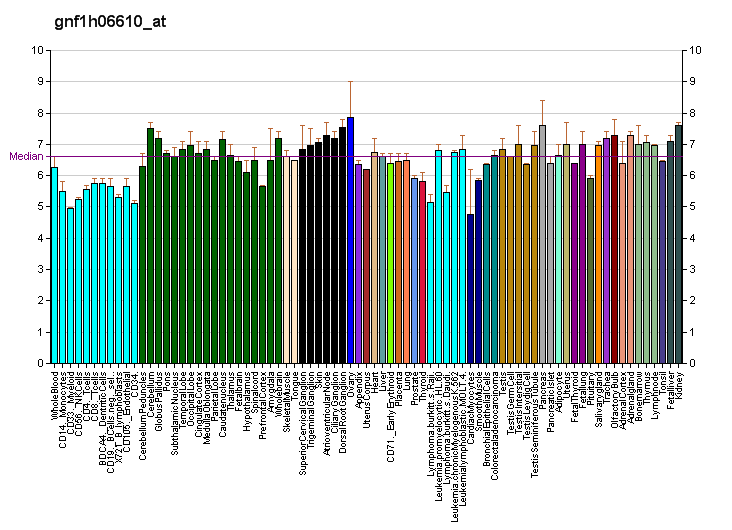
RNA expression pattern
Bgee	Human / Mouse (ortholog); Top expressed in: gonad; testicle; ganglionic eminence; appendix; pituitary gland; lactiferous gland; anterior pituitary; muscle layer of sigmoid colon; right adrenal gland; hypothalamus / Top expressed in: lumbar spinal ganglion; internal carotid artery; external carotid artery; inner renal medulla; blood; epithelium of lens; ventricular zone; efferent ductule; human fetus; dermis; More reference expression data
BioGPS	More reference expression data
Gene ontology
Molecular function	signal transducer activity; neuropeptide Y receptor activity; pancreatic polypeptide receptor activity; G protein-coupled receptor activity
Cellular component	plasma membrane; membrane; integral component of membrane; integral component of plasma membrane
Biological process	circadian rhythm; negative regulation of apoptotic process; signal transduction; neuropeptide signaling pathway; chemical synaptic transmission; feeding behavior; blood circulation; G protein-coupled receptor signaling pathway
Sources:Amigo / QuickGO
Orthologs
Databases	NCBI: entry; OMA: entry
Species	Human	Mouse
Entrez	10887	58182
Ensembl	ENSG00000169618	ENSMUSG00000049409
UniProt	Q8TCW9	Q9JKL1
RefSeq (mRNA)	NM_138964	NM_021381; NM_001355655
RefSeq (protein)	NP_620414	NP_067356; NP_001342584
Location (UCSC)	Chr 2: 68.64 – 68.66 Mb	Chr 6: 87.56 – 87.57 Mb
PubMed search
- Wikidata
View/Edit Human	View/Edit Mouse

Prokineticin receptor 1, also known as PKR_{1}, is a human protein encoded by the PROKR1 gene.

== See also ==
- Prokineticin receptor
