= Prokineticin =

Protein found in vertebrates

Prokineticin 1
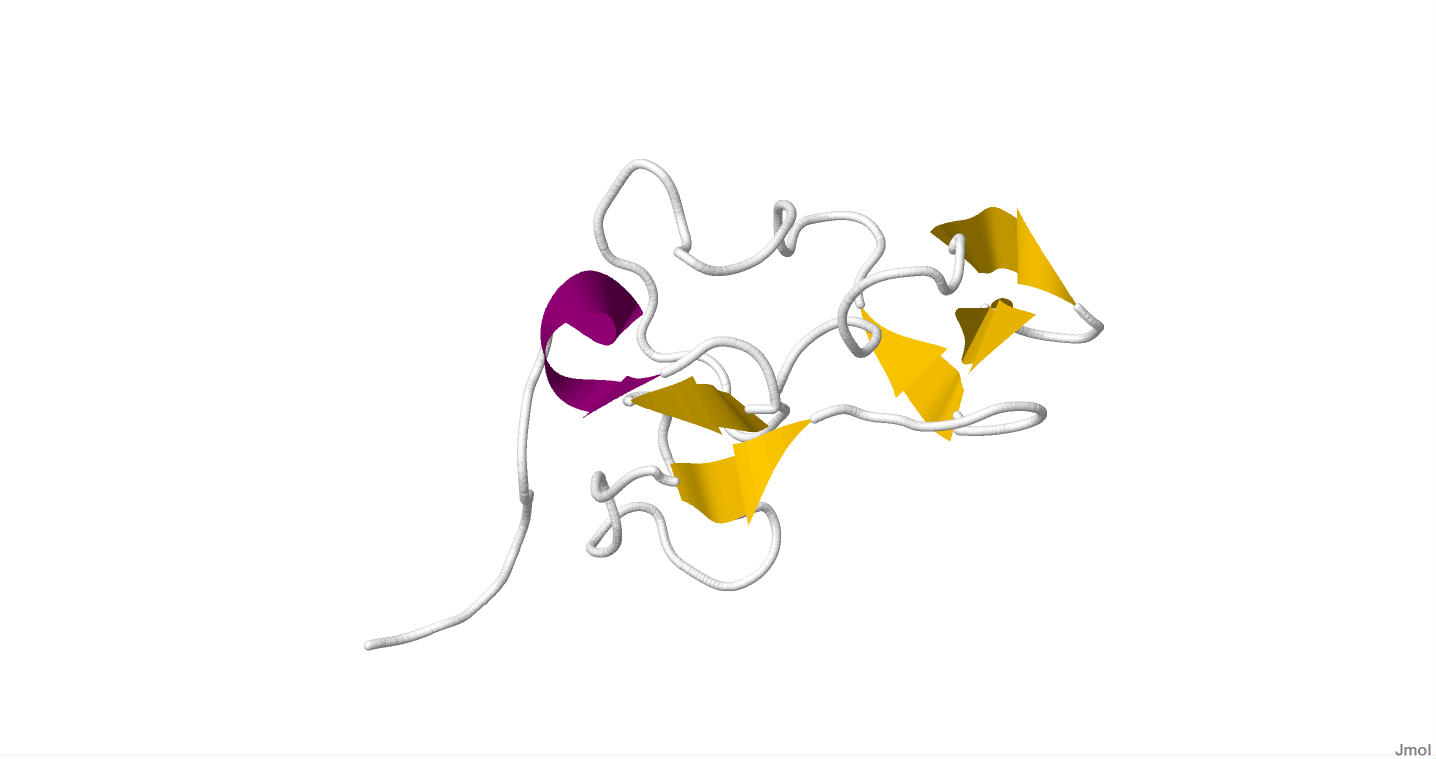
- Prokineticin 1

Identifiers
- Symbol: PROK1
- NCBI gene: 84432
- HGNC: 18454
- OMIM: 606233
- RefSeq: NM_032414
- UniProt: P58294

Other data
- Locus: Chr. 1 p21
Search for
- Structures: Swiss-model
- Domains: InterPro

prokineticin 2

Identifiers
- Symbol: PROK2
- NCBI gene: 60675
- HGNC: 18455
- OMIM: 607002
- RefSeq: NM_021935
- UniProt: Q9HC23

Other data
- Locus: Chr. 3 p21.1
Search for
- Structures: Swiss-model
- Domains: InterPro

Prokineticin is a secreted protein that potently contracts gastrointestinal smooth muscle.

Recently, prokineticins have been recognized in humans and other vertebrates. They are thought to be involved in several important physiological processes like neurogenesis, tissue development, angiogenesis, and nociception. Other important physiological roles the Bv8/Prokineticins (PKs) are involved in may include cancer, reproduction, and regulating physiological functions that influence circadian rhythms like hormone secretion, ingestive behaviors, and the sleep/wake cycle.

Mutations in the PROK2 (also known as KAL4) gene have been implicated in hypogonadotropic hypogonadism and gynecomastia. An analysis of DNA from Adolf Hitler found he had a deletion in the PROK2 gene, suggesting he may have had Kallman syndrome.

== See also ==
- Prokineticin receptor
