= Poor ovarian reserve =

- Other names: Impaired ovarian reserve, premature ovarian aging, declining ovarian reserve
- Specialty: Gynecology

Poor ovarian reserve is a condition of low fertility characterized by 1): low numbers of remaining oocytes in the ovaries or 2) possibly impaired preantral oocyte development or recruitment. Recent research suggests that premature ovarian aging and premature ovarian failure (aka primary ovarian insufficiency) may represent a continuum of premature ovarian senescence. It is usually accompanied by high FSH (follicle stimulating hormone) levels.

Quality of the eggs may also be impaired. However, other studies show no association with elevated FSH levels and genetic quality of embryos after adjusting for age. The decline in quality was age related, not FSH related as the younger women with high day three FSH levels had higher live birth rates than the older women with high FSH. There was no significant difference in genetic embryo quality between same aged women regardless of FSH levels. A 2008 study concluded that diminished reserve did not affect the quality of oocytes and any reduction in quality in diminished reserve women was age related. One expert concluded: in young women with poor reserve when eggs are obtained they have near normal rates of implantation and pregnancy rates, but they are at high risk for IVF cancellation; if eggs are obtained, pregnancy rates are typically better than in older woman with normal reserve. However, if the FSH level is extremely elevated these conclusions are likely not applicable.

== Presentation ==
=== Related conditions ===
- Premature ovarian failure: Defined as no menses for six months before the age of forty due to any cause. Often diagnosed by elevated gonadotropin (Follicle-stimulating hormone (FSH) and LH) levels. In some cases (more so in younger women) ovarian function and ovulation can spontaneously resume. With POF up to 50% of women may ovulate once in any given year and 5–10% may become pregnant. POF is often associated with autoimmune diseases.
- Premature menopause: An outdated synonym for premature ovarian failure. The term encompasses premature menopause due to any cause, including surgical removal of the ovaries for any reason. Early menopause and premature ovarian failure are no longer considered to be the same condition.

== Cause ==
- Natural decline of ovarian reserve due to age.
- Idiopathic.
- Genetic factors, such as fragile x syndrome. Approximately 20–28% of women with an FMR1 premutation (55–200 CGG repeats) experience fragile x primary ovarian insufficiency (POI) and another 23% experience early menopause (i.e., menopause before the age of forty five).
- Autoimmune disorders.
- Adrenal gland impairment.
- Iatrogenic, e.g., due to radiation, chemotherapy or surgery, such as laserization of the surface of the ovary to treat endometriosis. Excessive laparoscopic ovarian drilling has been reported to cause premature ovarian failure. (The primordial follicles are located in the thin outer one-millimeter layer of the ovary.)

== Diagnosis ==
There is some controversy as the accuracy of the tests used to predict poor ovarian reserve. One systematic review concluded that the accuracy of predicting the occurrence of pregnancy is very limited. When a high threshold is used, to prevent couples from wrongly being refused IVF, only approximately 3% of IVF-indicated cases are identified as having unfavourable prospects in an IVF treatment cycle. Also, the review concluded the use of any ORT (Ovarian Reserve Testing) for outcome prediction cannot be supported. Also Centers for Disease Control and Prevention statistics show that the success rates for IVF with diminished ovarian reserve vary widely between IVF centers.

=== Follicle stimulating hormone ===
Elevated serum follicle stimulating hormone (FSH) level measured on day three of the menstrual cycle. (First day of period flow is counted as day one. Spotting is not considered start of period.) If a lower value occurs from later testing, the highest value is considered the most predictive. FSH assays can differ somewhat so reference ranges as to what is normal, premenopausal or menopausal should be based on ranges provided by the laboratory doing the testing. Estradiol (E2) should also be measured as women who ovulate early may have elevated E2 levels above 80 pg/mL (due to early follicle recruitment, possibly due to a low serum inhibin B level) which will mask an elevated FSH level and give a false negative result.

High FSH strongly predicts poor IVF response in older women, less so in younger women. One study showed an elevated basal day-three FSH is correlated with diminished ovarian reserve in women aged over 35 years and is associated with poor pregnancy rates after treatment of ovulation induction (6% versus 42%).

The rates for spontaneous pregnancy in older women with elevated FSH levels have not been studied very well and the spontaneous pregnancy success rate, while low, may be underestimated due to non reporting bias, as most infertility clinics will not accept women over the age of forty with FSH levels in the premenopausal range or higher.

A woman can have a normal day-three FSH level yet still respond poorly to ovarian stimulation and hence can be considered to have poor reserve. Thus, another FSH-based test is often used to detect poor ovarian reserve: the clomid challenge test, also known as CCCT (clomiphene citrate challenge test).

=== Antral follicle count ===
Transvaginal ultrasonography can be used to determine the number of antral follicles in an antral follicle count (AFC). This is an easy-to-perform and noninvasive method (but there may be some discomfort). A study found that AFC was a better predictive parameter to test than AMH. Several studies show this test to be more accurate than basal FSH testing for older women (< 44 years of age) in predicting IVF outcome.

Age and AFC and Age of Loss of Natural Fertility

Antral Follicle Count (Both Ovaries)	Age at Time of Count	Age of Loss of Natural Fertility
6	30	29–33
6	35	33–38
6	40	38–41
10	30	33–38
10	35	38–41
15	30	38–41 (closer to 41)

AFC and FSH Stimulation Recommendations for Cycles Using Assisted Reproduction Technology

Antral Follicle Count	Significance
< 4	Poor reserve
4–7	Low count, high dosage of FSH required
8–12	Slightly reduced reserve
> 12	Normal

=== Other ===
- Declining serum levels of anti-Müllerian hormone. Recent studies have validated the use of serum AMH levels as a marker for the quantitative aspect of ovarian reserve. Because of the lack of cycle variations in serum levels of AMH, this marker has been proposed to be used as part of the standard diagnostic procedures to assess ovarian dysfunctions, such as premature ovarian failure. One study has shown AMH to be a better marker than basal FSH for women with proven (prior) fertility in measuring age related decline in ovarian reserve.
- Inhibin B blood level. Inhibin B levels tend to decline in advanced reproductive aged women due to both fewer follicles and decreased secretion by the granulosa cells. Inhibin B levels start to rise around day zero and low day three levels are associated with poor IVF outcome.
- Ultrasound measurement of ovarian volume. Lass and Brinsden (1999) report that the correlation between ovarian volume and follicular density appears to only hold in women ≥ 35 years of age.
- Dynamic Assessment Following GnRH-a Administration (GAST). This test measures the change in serum estradiol levels between cycle day two and three after administration of one mg of subcutaneous leuprolide acetate, a gonadotropin releasing hormone agonist. Patients with estradiol elevations by day two followed by a decline by day three had improved implantation and pregnancy rates than those patients with either no rise in estradiol or persistently elevated estradiol levels.
- Home testing of FSH urine concentration to alert a woman to possible impaired ovarian reserve became possible in June 2007 with the introduction of Fertell in the United States and UK, which claims a 95% equivalence to standard serum marker results.

== Treatment ==
Variable success rate with treatment, very few controlled studies, mostly case reports. Treatment success strongly tends to diminish with age and degree of elevation of FSH.

- Donor oocyte. Oocyte donation is the most successful method for producing pregnancy in perimenopausal women. In the UK the use of donor oocytes after natural menopause is controversial. A 1995 study reported that women age fifty or higher experience similar pregnancy rates after oocyte donation as younger women. They are at equal risk for multiple gestation as younger women. In addition, antenatal complications were experienced by the majority of patients, and that high risk obstetric surveillance and care is vital.
- Natural or Mini-IVF, but without the use of hCG to trigger ovulation, instead the GnRH agonist Synarel (nafarelin acetate) in a diluted form is taken as a nasal spray to trigger ovulation. Human chorionic gonadotropin (hCG) has a long half-life and may stimulate (luteinize) small follicles prematurely and cause them to become cysts. Whereas nafarelin acetate in a nasal spray induces a short lived LH surge that is high enough to induce ovulation in large follicles, but too short lived to adversely affect small follicles. This increases the likelihood of the small follicles and oocytes therein developing normally for upcoming cycles and also allows the woman to cycle without taking a break and consequently increases the probability of conception in poor ovarian reserve women and advanced reproductive aged women.
- Pretreatment with 50 mcg ethinylestradiol three times a day for two weeks, followed by recombinant FSH 200 IU/day subcutaneously. Ethinylestradiol treatment was maintained during FSH stimulation. When at least one follicle reached 18mm in diameter and serum estradiol was greater or equal to 150 pg/ML ovulation was induced with an intramuscular injection of 10,000 IU of hCG (human chorionic gonadotropin hormone). For luteal phase support 5,000 IU of hCG was administered every 72 hours. Out of 25 patients 8 ovulated and 4 became pregnant. In the control group there were no ovulations. The patients ranged in age between 24 and 39 years with an average age of 32.7. All women had amenorrhea for at least 6 months (average 16.75 months) and FSH levels greater or equal than 40 mIU/mL (average FSH 68 mIU/ML). The researchers believe this protocol would work for women in early post menopause as well.
- Ethinylestradiol or other synthetic estrogens along with luteal phase progesterone (twice daily 200 mg vaginal suppositories) and estradiol support. Ethinylestradiol lowers high FSH levels which then, it is theorized, up regulates FSH receptor sites and restores sensitivity to FSH. Ethinylestradiol also has the advantage that it does not interfere with the measurement of serum levels of endogenous estradiol. During the luteal phase the FSH levels should be kept low for subsequent cycles, thus the phase is supplemented with 4 mg oral estradiol. Since conception may have occurred estradiol is used instead of the synthetic ethinylestradiol.
- Cyclical hormone replacement therapy.
- The following protocols have shown promise: high dose gonadoropins, flare up GnRH-a protocol (standard or microdose), stop protocols, short protocol, natural cycle or modified natural cycle and low dose hCG during the beginning of the stimulation protocol.
- Gonadotropin-releasing hormone agonist/antagonist conversion with estrogen priming (AACEP) protocol. Fisch, Keskintepe and Sher report 35% (14 out of 40) ongoing gestation in women with elevated FSH levels (all women had prior IVF and poor quality embryos); among women aged 41–42 the ongoing gestation rate was 19% (5 out of 26).
- DHEA: Recent clinical trial by the Center for Human Reproduction in New York showed significant effectiveness. Leonidas and Eudoxia Mamas report six cases of premature ovarian failure. After two to six months of treatment with DHEA (Two 25 mg capsules daily in five cases and three 25 mg capsules daily in one case.) all women conceived. One delivered via C-section, one aborted at 7 weeks and the remaining four were reported at 11 to 27 weeks gestation. Ages were from 37 to 40. FSH levels were from 30 to 112 mIU/mL. Ammenorhea ranged from 9 to 13 months. In addition, there is strong evidence that continuous micronized DHEA 25 mg TID reduces miscarriage and aneuploidy rates, especially above age 35.
- A combined pentoxifylline-tocopherol treatment has been reported effective in improving uterine parameters in women with POF undergoing IVF with donor oocytes (IVF-OD). Three women with uterine hormonoresistance despite high estradiol (E2) plasma levels received treatment with 800 mg pentoxifylline and 1000 IU of vitamin E for at least nine months. Three frozen-thawed embryo transfers (ETs) resulted in two viable pregnancies. Mean endometrial thickness increased from 4.9 mm (with thin uterine crosses) to 7.4 mm with nice uterine crosses. This treatment protocol has also reversed some cases of iatrogenic POF caused by full body radiation treatment.

== Research ==
While the primary cause of the end to menstrual cycles is the exhaustion of ovarian follicles, there is some evidence that a defect in the hypothalamus is critical in the transition from regular to irregular cycles. This is supported by at least one study in which transplantation of ovaries from old rats to young ovariectomized rats resulted in follicular development and ovulation. Also, electrical stimulation of the hypothalamus is capable of restoring reproductive function in aged animals. Due to the complex interrelationship among the hypothalamus, pituitary and ovaries (HPO axis) defects in the functioning of one level can cause defects on the other levels.
