= M33 (gene) =

M33 is a gene. It is a mammalian homologue of Drosophila Polycomb. It localises to euchromatin within interphase nuclei, but it is enriched within the centromeric heterochromatin of metaphase chromosomes. In mice, the official symbol of M33 gene styled Cbx2 and the official name chromobox 2 are maintained by the MGI. Also known as pc; MOD2. In human ortholog CBX2, synonyms CDCA6, M33, SRXY5 from orthology source HGNC. M33 was isolated by means of the structural similarity of its chromodomain. It contains a region of homology shared by Xenopus and Drosophila in the fifth exon. Polycomb genes in Drosophila mediate changes in higher-order chromatin structure to maintain the repressed state of developmentally regulated genes . It may also involved in the campomelic syndrome and neoplastic disorders linked to allele loss in this region. Disruption of the murine M33 gene, displayed posterior transformation of the sternal ribs and vertebral columns .

== Gene location ==
The mouse M33 gene is located on the Chromosome 11, from base pair 119,022,962 to base pair 119,031,270 (Build GRCm38/mm10). Human homolog of M33, Chromobox homolog 2 (CBX2 ) is located on Chromosome 17, from base pair 79,777,188 to base pair 79,787,650(Build GRCh38.p2).

Location of the M33 gene on chromosome 11.

== Protein structure ==
This protein contains Chromo (CHRromatin Organization MOdifier) domain and nuclear localization signal motif. The full-length M33 sequence encodes a 519 amino acid (aa) protein.

== Function and mechanism ==
The mouse Polycomb group (PcG) protein M33 maintains repressed states of developmentally important genes, including homeotic genes and forms nuclear complexes with other PcG members. e.g.BMI1. It also direct and/or indirect controls the vicinity of Hox genes regulatory regions, which are the accessibility of retinoic acid response elements . homeotic transformations of the axial skeleton, and growth retardation. Moreover, the deficient of M33 also possessed abnormally few nucleated cells in the thymus and spleen, due to the aberrant T-cell expansion. In transiently transfected cells, M33 acts as a transcriptional repressor . Biochemical assays indicate that two murine proteins, Ring1A and Ring1B interact directly with the repressor domain of M33 and that Ring1A can also behave as a transcriptional repressor.

== Mutation ==
Katoh-Fukui et al. (1998)
