= Chromobox 2 =

Protein-coding gene in humans

CBX2
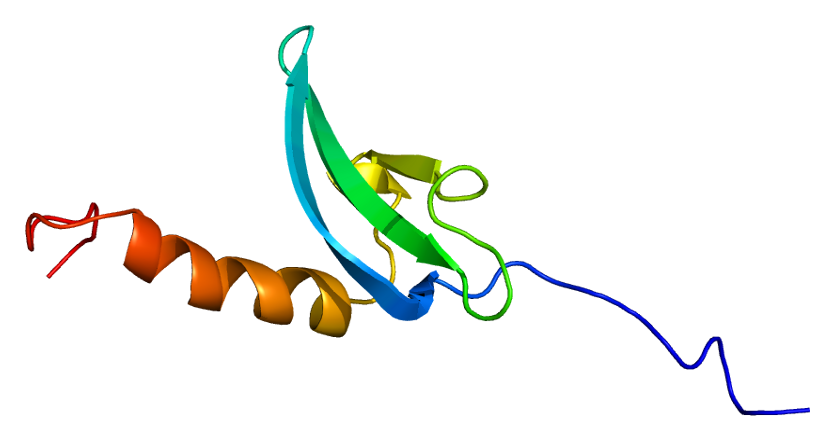

Identifiers
- Aliases: CBX2, CDCA6, M33, SRXY5, chromobox 2
- External IDs: OMIM: 602770; MGI: 88289; GeneCards: CBX2
Available structures
PDB	Ortholog search: PDBe RCSB
PDB	List of PDB id codes 2D9U, 3H91, 5EPK

Gene location (Human)
Chr.	Chromosome 17 (human)
Band	17q25.3	Start	79,778,148 bp
Band	17q25.3	End	79,787,983 bp

Gene location (Mouse)
Chr.	Chromosome 11 (mouse)
Band	11 E2|11 83.33 cM	Start	118,913,788 bp
Band	11 E2|11 83.33 cM	End	118,922,096 bp
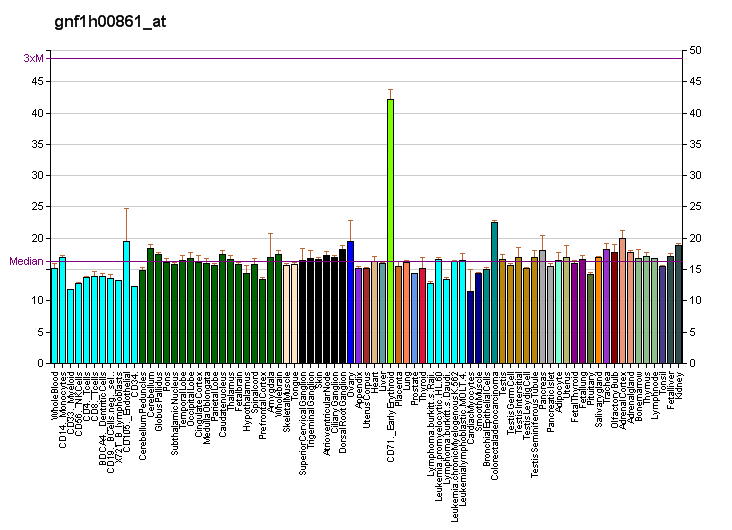

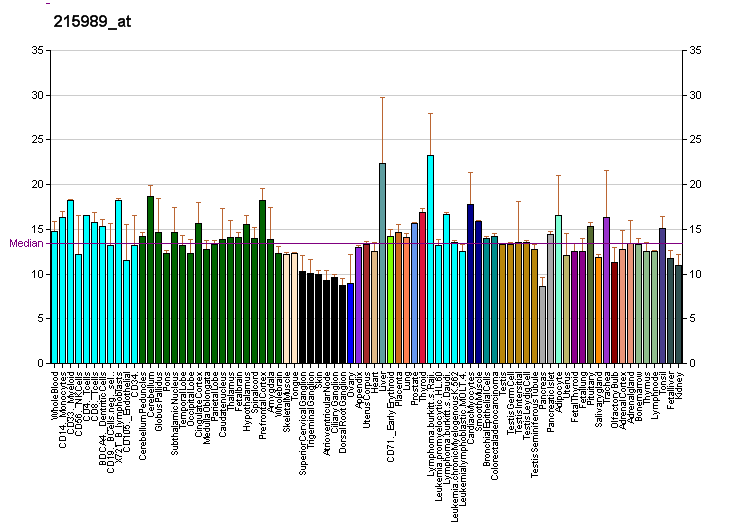
RNA expression pattern
Bgee	Human / Mouse (ortholog); Top expressed in: secondary oocyte; gonad; ganglionic eminence; ventricular zone; testicle; right testis; apex of heart; left testis; sperm; stromal cell of endometrium / Top expressed in: gastrula; mandibular prominence; maxillary prominence; secondary oocyte; zygote; primary oocyte; somite; genital tubercle; tail of embryo; epiblast; More reference expression data
BioGPS	More reference expression data
Gene ontology
Molecular function	DNA binding; methylated histone binding; chromatin binding; protein binding
Cellular component	heterochromatin; euchromatin; PcG protein complex; PRC1 complex; nucleus; nucleoplasm; chromosome
Biological process	cell differentiation; development of primary sexual characteristics; sex differentiation; regulation of transcription, DNA-templated; negative regulation of transcription by RNA polymerase II; transcription, DNA-templated; chromatin organization
Sources:Amigo / QuickGO
Orthologs
Databases	NCBI: entry; OMA: entry
Species	Human	Mouse
Entrez	84733	12416
Ensembl	ENSG00000173894	ENSMUSG00000025577
UniProt	Q14781	P30658
RefSeq (mRNA)	NM_005189; NM_032647	NM_007623
RefSeq (protein)	NP_005180; NP_116036	NP_031649
Location (UCSC)	Chr 17: 79.78 – 79.79 Mb	Chr 11: 118.91 – 118.92 Mb
PubMed search
- Wikidata
View/Edit Human	View/Edit Mouse

Chromobox protein homolog 2 is a protein that in humans is encoded by the CBX2 gene.

== Interactions ==
CBX2 (gene) has been shown to interact with RYBP.
