= Acquired =

Business podcast

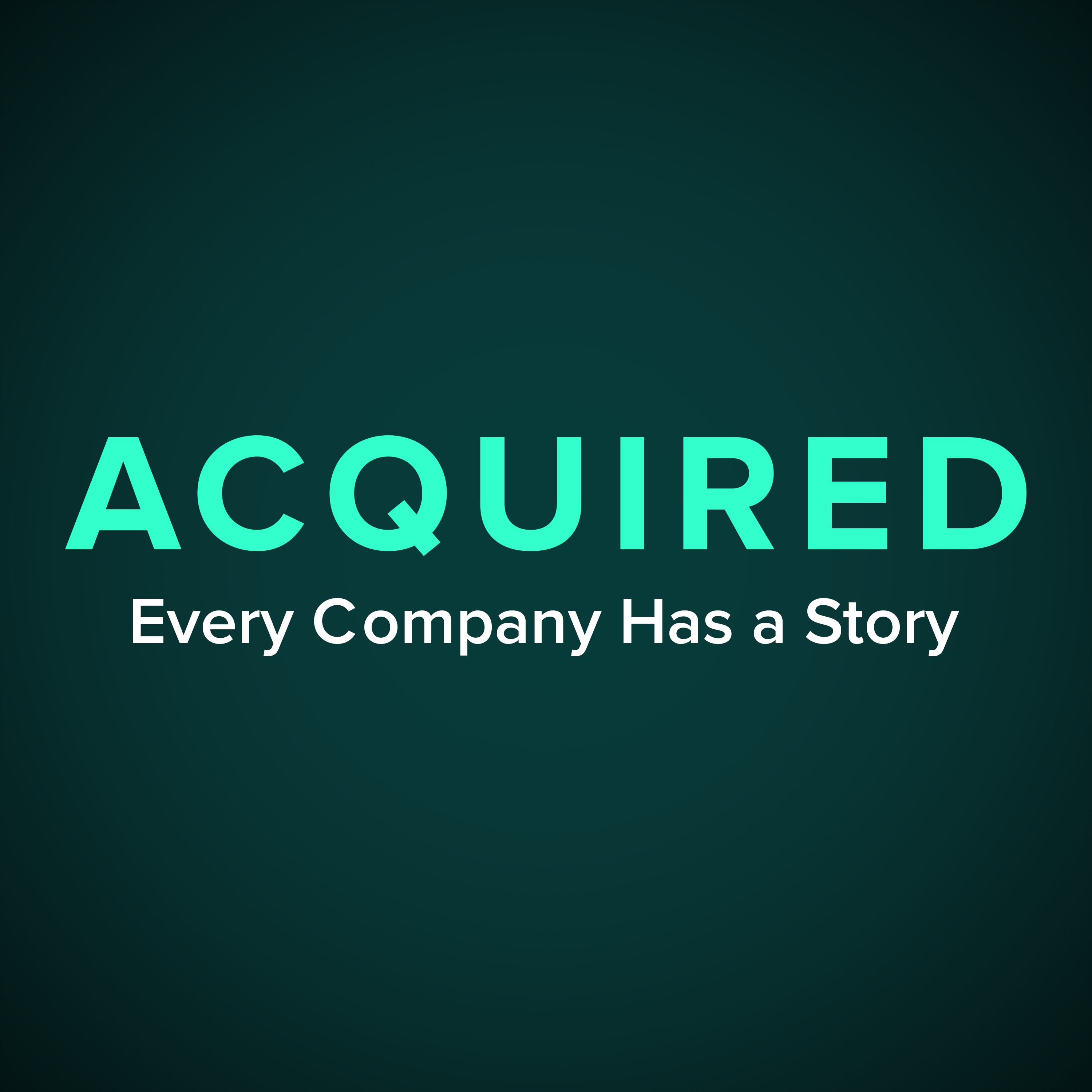
- Genre: Business; Technology
- Format: Audio
- Language: English

Cast and voices
- Hosted by: Ben Gilbert and David Rosenthal

Production
- Length: 2–4 hours

Publication
- No. of episodes: 214 (as of June 4, 2026)
- Original release: October 15, 2015
- Updates: Roughly monthly

Related
- Website: acquired.fm

YouTube information
- Channel: Acquired
- Years active: 2020–present
- Subscribers: 304,000
- Views: 95 million
- Last updated: June 4, 2026

Acquired is a business podcast hosted by Ben Gilbert and David Rosenthal that examines the history and strategy of major companies. Each episode is a long-form narrative deep dive into a single company, often running three to four hours, and the hosts have described the format as a "conversational audiobook" rather than a conventional podcast. As of 2025 the show reached more than one million listeners per episode and was among the highest-ranked technology podcasts on Apple Podcasts and Spotify.

== History ==
Gilbert and Rosenthal in 2025

Gilbert and Rosenthal met while working together at the Seattle venture capital firm Madrona Venture Group, where they became friends discussing the histories of technology companies. They launched the podcast in 2015 as a side project; its original premise was to analyze technology acquisitions that had proven pivotal to the acquiring company. The first episode, released in October 2015, examined Disney's acquisition of Pixar.

A May 2024 Wall Street Journal profile, which called Acquired "the business world's favorite podcast," was followed by a substantial increase in the show's audience. By 2024 the program was frequently cited as the top technology podcast on Apple Podcasts and Spotify, with more than one million listeners per episode.

In July 2025, Acquired hosted a live event in Radio City Music Hall that featured J.P. Morgan CEO Jamie Dimon and other guests.

== Format and production ==
Acquired episodes are unscripted in tone but heavily researched, with Gilbert and Rosenthal reporting that they each spend roughly 100 hours preparing for a single episode, drawing on books, financial filings, primary sources and interviews. Recording sessions run for several hours while the hosts stand, and the raw audio is then edited down to the final length. A typical episode opens with a history of the company, led by Rosenthal, interspersed with analysis, and concludes with a strategic assessment that draws on Hamilton Helmer's framework 7 Powers. The hosts have said they deliberately avoid breaking news, aiming to keep episodes "evergreen." The show's recurring theme music, "Who Got the Truth?", is performed by Mike Taylor. Companies featured over the years have included Nvidia, Nike, Costco, LVMH, Standard Oil and The NFL, among others.

== Live events ==
The hosts hold periodic live shows. In September 2024, Acquired staged a sold-out live event at San Francisco's Chase Center, presented by J.P. Morgan Payments, drawing roughly 6,000 attendees; the headline guest was Meta chief executive Mark Zuckerberg, with appearances by Spotify CEO Daniel Ek and journalist Emily Chang. In July 2025, marking the show's tenth anniversary, the hosts performed a live event at Radio City Music Hall in New York City that featured J.P. Morgan Chase CEO Jamie Dimon and other guests.

== Reception ==
In 2024, The Wall Street Journal profiled the show under the headline "The Smartest People in the Room Are All Listening to the Same Podcast," describing its appeal to an audience heavily concentrated among technology, finance and business leaders. The same year, Apple's senior vice president of services, Eddy Cue, publicly praised the show. In July 2025, Time named Acquired to its list of the 100 Best Podcasts of All Time.
