= Ovarian reserve =

Measure of viable ova

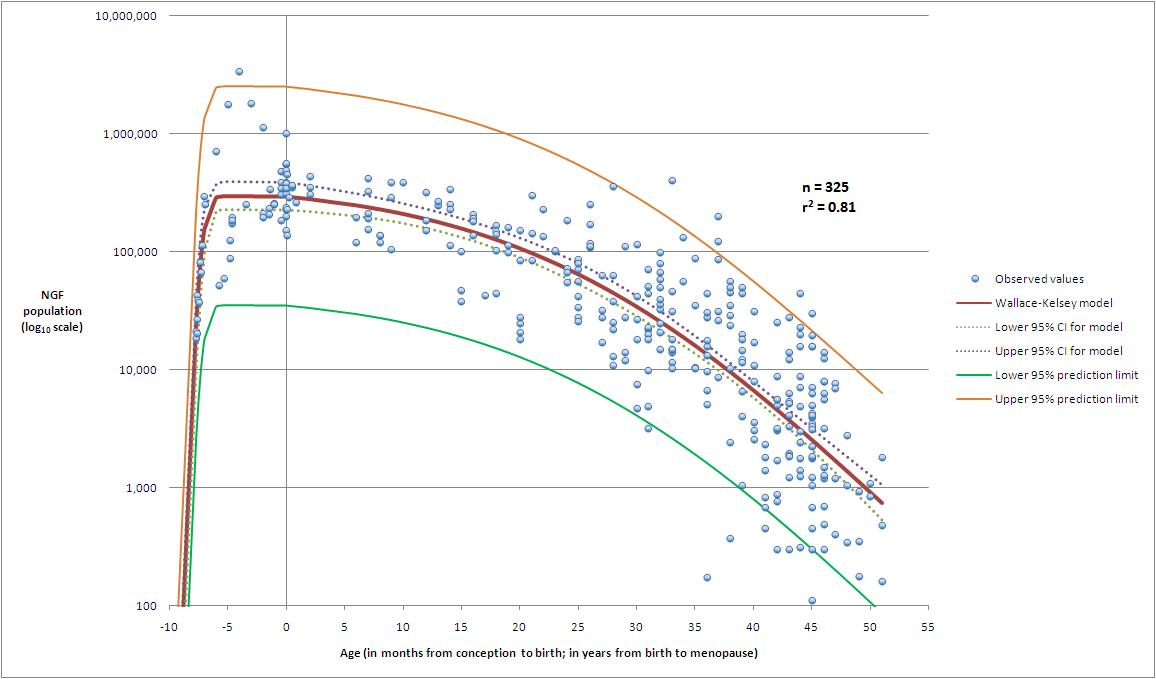
Model of ovarian reserve from conception to the menopause

Ovarian reserve is a term that is used to determine the capacity of the ovary to provide egg cells that are capable of fertilization resulting in a healthy and successful pregnancy. With advanced maternal age, the number of egg cells that can be successfully recruited for a possible pregnancy declines, constituting a major factor in the inverse correlation between age and female fertility.

While there is no known method for assessing the ovarian reserve of individual women, indirect determination of ovarian reserve is important in the treatment of infertility.

== Establishment ==
The ovary is generally thought of as an egg bank from which the woman draws during her reproductive life. The human ovary contains a population of primordial follicles. At 18–22 weeks post-conception, the female ovary contains its peak number of follicles (about 300,000 in the average case, but individual peak populations range from 35,000 to 2.5 million).

The size of the initial ovarian reserve is strongly influenced by genetics. Also, elevated androgen levels during prenatal development have an adverse effect on the early establishment of the ovarian reserve.

The mitosis starts the 3rd week of embryo intrauterine life and between the 5th and 7th week, there are already about 10.000 oogonias. However, the ovarian reserve is at maximum value in sixth month old fetuses. Then this amount is only decreasing, as there is no new synthesis and differentiation. There is a huge decrease before the child is born, being this pool reduced from over 8 million oocytes to 2 million. The amount continues decreasing progressively until reaching the age of 30 years old, in which there is a dramatic decrease.

There are about 1 to 2 million oocytes when a woman is born. From them, 400000 oocytes will reach the stage of puberty and only 400 will reach maturation and ovulation. The rest of them reach atresia, a natural apoptotic process leading to the breakdown of the follicle.

== Decline ==
Each menstrual cycle one egg cell is released by ovulation. In addition, the remaining follicles that were recruited towards maturation are lost by atresia. Few if any egg cells are replenished during the reproductive years. However, this loss by the menstrual cycle only accounts for approximately up to 10 egg cells per month, thus accounting for only a small fraction of the actual loss of egg cells throughout the lifetime.

One additional contributory mechanism for the decline in the ovarian reserve with age appears to be a decreased gene expression of proteins involved in DNA repair by homologous recombination such as BRCA1, MRE11, Rad51 and ATM. Homologous recombinational repair of DNA double-strand breaks mediated by BRCA1 and ATM weakens with age in oocytes of humans and other species. Women with BRCA1 mutations have lower ovarian reserves and experience earlier menopause than women without these mutations.

== Assessment ==
Women who are 35 years or older who have attempted to get pregnant unsuccessfully for 6 months should undergo testing for ovarian reserve. The most commonly used test to assess this ovarian reserve is the day 3 FSH test. This blood test determines the level of FSH on cycle day 3. Cycle day 3 is chosen because at this time the estrogen level is expected to be low, a critical feature, as FSH levels are subject to a negative feedback. Thus any determination of FSH needs to include the corresponding estradiol level to indicate that the FSH level was drawn when the estrogen level was low. In a patient with infrequent menstruation, an FSH level and estrogen level could be measured at random and is valid if the estrogen level is low. Generally FSH levels are expected to be below 10 miu/ml in women with reproductive potential (levels of 10-15 miu/ml are considered borderline), however the exact numbers returned will depend on the type of assay used in a particular laboratory.

Although FSH and more recently Inhibin B have been shown to have some correlation with ovarian reserve, it is now well established that anti-Müllerian Hormone or AMH is more useful biochemical test. AMH appears to play a role not only in the selection of the primary follicle but also in the overall process of recruiting preantral follicles. Around fifteen years before menopause, a gradual decrease in AMH levels follows a logarithmic pattern. This decline continues until about five years before menopause, at which point AMH levels reach a notably low point. However, for people with increased AMH due to PCOS that has been adequately managed with diet, exercise, and/or bariatric surgery, fertility improves even when AMH returns to normal levels. In particular, an AMH level between 7.14-25 pmol/L indicates a normal ovarian response. In contrast, an AMH level of less than 7.14 pmol/L and an AMH level greater than 25 pmol/L indicate a low ovarian response and a high ovarian response, respectively. High levels however can be present in women with Polycystic Ovarian Syndrome which compromises female fertility and therefore a combination of AMH and a transvaginal ultrasound to count the number of antral follicles is probably the best way to assess ovarian reserve and future fertility. This combination is sometimes referred to as the Biological Body Clock Test.

A clomiphene challenge test is a variation on this approach.

Another approach is to examine the ovaries by gynecologic ultrasonography and to determine their size as ovaries depleted of egg cells tend to be smaller and to examine the number of antral follicles visible by sonography.

=== Implications ===
Women with poor ovarian reserve are unlikely to conceive with infertility therapy. Also see poor ovarian reserve and Follicle-stimulating hormone for treatment options.

== See also ==
- DNA damage (naturally occurring)
- Folliculogenesis
- Oogenesis
