= Prokineticin receptor 2 =

Protein-coding gene in the species Homo sapiens

PROKR2

Identifiers
- Aliases: PROKR2, GPR73L1, GPR73b, GPRg2, HH3, KAL3, PKR2, dJ680N4.3, prokineticin receptor 2
- External IDs: OMIM: 607123; MGI: 2181363; GeneCards: PROKR2

Gene location (Human)
Chr.	Chromosome 20 (human)
Band	20p12.3	Start	5,299,218 bp
Band	20p12.3	End	5,316,954 bp

Gene location (Mouse)
Chr.	Chromosome 2 (mouse)
Band	2|2 F2	Start	132,179,653 bp
Band	2|2 F2	End	132,227,367 bp
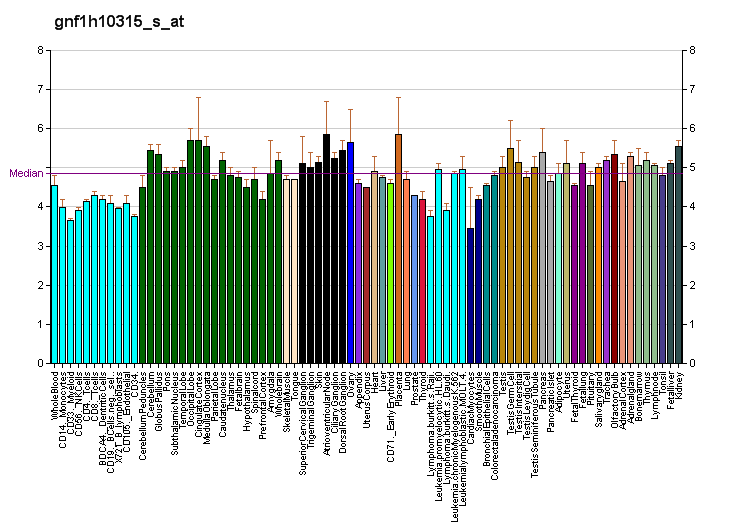
RNA expression pattern
Bgee	Human / Mouse (ortholog); Top expressed in: ganglionic eminence; ventricular zone; prefrontal cortex; Brodmann area 9; anterior cingulate cortex; lymph node; right frontal lobe; bone marrow; hippocampus proper; superior frontal gyrus / Top expressed in: Rostral migratory stream; lumbar spinal ganglion; suprachiasmatic nucleus; tail of embryo; medial ganglionic eminence; olfactory bulb; Gonadal ridge; thymus; Sertoli cell; anterior amygdaloid area; More reference expression data
BioGPS	More reference expression data
Gene ontology
Molecular function	signal transducer activity; neuropeptide Y receptor activity; pancreatic polypeptide receptor activity; G protein-coupled receptor activity
Cellular component	membrane; integral component of membrane; plasma membrane; integral component of plasma membrane
Biological process	circadian rhythm; signal transduction; neuropeptide signaling pathway; chemical synaptic transmission; feeding behavior; blood circulation; G protein-coupled receptor signaling pathway
Sources:Amigo / QuickGO
Orthologs
Databases	NCBI: entry; OMA: entry
Species	Human	Mouse
Entrez	128674	246313
Ensembl	ENSG00000101292	ENSMUSG00000050558
UniProt	Q8NFJ6	Q8K458
RefSeq (mRNA)	NM_144773	NM_144944
RefSeq (protein)	NP_658986	NP_659193
Location (UCSC)	Chr 20: 5.3 – 5.32 Mb	Chr 2: 132.18 – 132.23 Mb
PubMed search
- Wikidata
View/Edit Human	View/Edit Mouse

Prokineticin receptor 2 (PKR_{2}), is a dimeric G protein-coupled receptor encoded by the PROKR2 gene in humans.

== Function ==
Prokineticins are secreted proteins that can promote angiogenesis and induce strong gastrointestinal smooth muscle contraction. The protein encoded by this gene is an integral membrane protein and G protein-coupled receptor for prokineticins. PKR_{2} is composed of 384 amino acids. Asparagine residues at position 7 and 27 undergo N-linked glycosylation. Cysteine residues at position 128 and 208 form a disulfide bond. The encoded protein is similar in sequence to GPR73, another G protein-coupled receptor for prokineticins. PKR_{2} is also linked to mammalian circadian rhythm. Levels of PKR_{2} mRNA fluctuate in the suprachiasmatic nucleus, increasing during the day and decreasing at night.

Mutations in the PROKR2 (also known as KAL3) gene have been implicated in hypogonadotropic hypogonadism and gynecomastia. Total loss of PKR_{2} in mice leads to spontaneous torpor usually beginning at dusk and lasting for 8 hours on average.

PKR_{2} functions as a G protein-coupled receptor, thus it has a signaling cascade when it's ligand binds. PKR_{2} is a Gq-coupled protein, so when the ligand binds, beta-type phospholipase C is activated which creates inositol triphosphate. This then triggers calcium release inside the cell.

== See also ==
- Prokineticin receptor
- Kallmann syndrome
