= Fertile eunuch syndrome =

- Other names: Pasqualini syndrome
- Fertile eunuch syndrome is inherited in an autosomal recessive manner.
- Specialty: Medical genetics

The fertile eunuch syndrome or Pasqualini syndrome is form of hypogonadotropic hypogonadism caused by a deficiency of luteinizing hormone. It is characterized by hypogonadism with spermatogenesis. The condition was first described in 1950 by Pasqualini and Bu, who published the first case of eunuchoidism with preserved spermatogenesis in la Revista de la Asociación Médica Argentina. The hypoandrogenism with spermatogenesis syndrome included:

(a) eunuchoidism,

(b) testis with normal spermatogenesis and full volume, with mature spermatozoids in a high proportion of seminiferous tubes and undifferentiated and immature Leydig cells

(c) full functional compensation through the administration of chorionic gonadotropin hormone, while hCG is administered

(d) total urinary gonadotrophins within normal limits

(e) this definition implies the normal activity of the pituitary and the absence of congenital malformations in general.

In describing five other similar cases in 1953, Mc Cullagh & al coined the term fertile eunuch introducing it in the English literature. Unfortunately, this term is incorrect and should not be employed. Indeed, these patients are not really eunuchs. Moreover, as it will be explained later, they are not usually fertile if not treated. A first step in the understanding of the physiopathology of Pasqualini syndrome was the absence of Lutheinizing Hormone (LH) in plasma and urine of patients. The second breakthrough was the functional and genetic studies that validated the hypothesis of a functional deficit of LH in these men. Inactivating LH mutations will then also be described in some women. Different groups demonstrated in these cases a LH with varying degrees of immunological activity but biologically inactive in most of the patients, due to one or more inactivating mutations in the LHB gene. Finally, the full comprehension of Pasqualini syndrome allowed to reverse the hypoandrogenic phenotype and to restore fertility in these patients through the use of chorionic gonadotropin and the modern in-vitro fertility techniques

== See also ==
- Hypogonadism
- Delayed puberty and infertility
- Hypothalamus, pituitary gland, and HPG axis
- GnRH and gonadotropins (FSH and LH)
- Sex hormones (androgens and estrogens)
- Kallmann syndrome and GnRH insensitivity
