= Isolated 17,20-lyase deficiency =

- Other names: 46,XY disorder of sex development due to isolated 17,20-lyase deficiency
- This condition is inherited via an autosomal recessive manner

Isolated 17,20-lyase deficiency (ILD), also called isolated 17,20-desmolase deficiency, is a rare endocrine and autosomal recessive genetic disorder which is characterized by a complete or partial loss of 17,20-lyase activity and, in turn, impaired production of the androgen and estrogen sex steroids. The condition manifests itself as pseudohermaphroditism (partially or fully underdeveloped genitalia) in males, in whom it is considered to be a form of intersex, and, in both sexes, as a reduced or absent puberty/lack of development of secondary sexual characteristics, resulting in a somewhat childlike appearance in adulthood (if left untreated).

Unlike the case of combined 17α-hydroxylase/17,20-lyase deficiency, isolated 17,20-lyase deficiency does not affect glucocorticoid production (or mineralocorticoid levels), and for that reason, does not result in adrenal hyperplasia or hypertension.

== Symptoms and signs ==
The symptoms of isolated 17,20-lyase deficiency, in males, include pseudohermaphroditism (i.e., feminized, ambiguous, or mildly underdeveloped (e.g., micropenis, perineal hypospadias, and/or cryptorchidism (undescended testes)) external genitalia), female gender identity, and, in non-complete cases of deficiency where partial virilization occurs, gynecomastia up to Tanner stage V (due to low androgen levels, which results in a lack of suppression of estrogen); in females, amenorrhoea or, in cases of only partial deficiency, merely irregular menses, and enlarged cystic ovaries (due to excessive stimulation by high levels of gonadotropins); and in both sexes, hypergonadotropic hypogonadism (hypogonadism despite high levels of gonadotropins), delayed, impaired, or fully absent adrenarche and puberty with an associated reduction in or complete lack of development of secondary sexual characteristics (sexual infantilism), impaired fertility or complete sterility, tall stature (due to delayed epiphyseal closure), eunuchoid skeletal proportions, delayed or absent bone maturation, and osteoporosis.

== Cause ==
Isolated 17,20-lyase deficiency is a rare disorder that can be caused by genetic mutations in the gene CYP17A1, or one of its redox partners POR or CYB5A, which interferes with its coded protein’s ability to function as 17,20-lyase, while not affecting its 17α-hydroxylase activity. Isolated 17,20 lyase deficiency is a rare disease with only a small number of confirmed reports due to mutations in the CYP17A1 gene.

Observed physiological abnormalities of the condition include markedly elevated serum levels of progestogens such as progesterone and 17α-hydroxyprogesterone (due to upregulation of precursor availability for androgen and estrogen synthesis), very low or fully absent peripheral concentrations of androgens such as dehydroepiandrosterone (DHEA), androstenedione, and testosterone and estrogens such as estradiol (due to the lack of 17,20-lyase activity, which is essential for their production), and high serum concentrations of the gonadotropins, follicle-stimulating hormone (FSH) and luteinizing hormone (LH) (due to a lack of negative feedback on account of the lack of sex hormones).

== Treatment ==
Males and females may be treated with hormone replacement therapy (i.e., with androgens and estrogens, respectively), which will result in normal sexual development and resolve most symptoms. In the case of 46,XY (genetically male) individuals who are phenotypically female and/or identify as the female gender, they should be treated with estrogens instead. Removal of the undescended testes should be performed in 46,XY females to prevent their malignant degeneration, whereas in 46,XY males surgical correction of the genitals is generally required, and, if necessary, an orchidopexy (relocation of the undescended testes to the scrotum) may be performed as well. Namely in genetic females presenting with ovarian cysts, GnRH analogues may be used to control high FSH and LH levels if they are unresponsive to estrogens.

== See also ==
- Cytochrome b_{5} deficiency
- Inborn errors of steroid metabolism
- Disorders of sexual development
- Intersexuality, pseudohermaphroditism, and ambiguous genitalia
- Combined 17α-hydroxylase/17,20-lyase deficiency
- GnRH, FSH, and LH insensitivities
- CYP17A1 (17α-hydroxylase/17,20-lyase)
- Sex hormone (androgen and estrogen)
