= Familial male-limited precocious puberty =

- Other names: Familial sexual precocity
- Male-limited precocious puberty has an autosomal dominant pattern of inheritance. However, only males are affected; females with the mutant gene are not affected.

Familial male-limited precocious puberty, often abbreviated as FMPP, also known as familial sexual precocity or gonadotropin-independent testotoxicosis, is a form of gonadotropin-independent precocious puberty in which boys experience early onset and progression of puberty. Signs of puberty can develop as early as an age of 1 year.

The spinal length in boys may be short due to a rapid advance in epiphyseal maturation. It is an autosomal dominant condition with a mutation of the luteinizing hormone (LH) receptor. As FMPP is a gonadotropin-independent form of precocious puberty, gonadotropin-releasing hormone agonists (GnRH agonists) are ineffective. Treatment is with drugs that suppress or block the effects of gonadal steroidogenesis, such as cyproterone acetate, ketoconazole, spironolactone, and testolactone. Alternatively, the combination of the androgen receptor antagonist bicalutamide and the aromatase inhibitor anastrozole may be used.

Robert King Stone, personal physician to American president Abraham Lincoln, described the first case of FMPP in 1852.

== See also ==
- Follicle-stimulating hormone insensitivity
- Gonadotropin-releasing hormone insensitivity
- Hypergonadism, hyperandrogenism, and precocious puberty
- Inborn errors of steroid metabolism
- Leydig cell hypoplasia (or LH insensitivity)
