= Inborn errors of steroid metabolism =

Inborn error of steroid metabolism
- Specialty: Medical genetics, endocrinology

Steroidogenesis.

An inborn error of steroid metabolism is an inborn error of metabolism due to defects in steroid metabolism.

== Types ==
A variety of conditions of abnormal steroidogenesis exist due to genetic mutations in the steroidogenic enzymes involved in the process, of which include:

=== Generalized ===
- 20,22-Desmolase (P450scc) deficiency: blocks production of all steroid hormones from cholesterol
- 3β-Hydroxysteroid dehydrogenase 2 deficiency: impairs progestogen and androgen metabolism; prevents the synthesis of estrogens, glucocorticoids, and mineralocorticoids; causes androgen deficiency in males and androgen excess in females
- Combined 17α-hydroxylase/17,20-lyase deficiency: impairs progestogen metabolism; prevents androgen, estrogen, and glucocorticoid synthesis; causes mineralocorticoid excess
- Cytochrome P450 oxidoreductase deficiency: prevents production of numerous but not all sex steroids, as well as other metabolic reactions

=== Androgen- and estrogen-specific ===
- Isolated 17,20-lyase deficiency: prevents androgen and estrogen synthesis.
  - Cytochrome b_{5} deficiency: subtype of isolated 17,20-lyase deficiency; additionally results in elevated methemoglobin and/or methemoglobinemia
- 17β-Hydroxysteroid dehydrogenase 3 deficiency: impairs androgen and estrogen metabolism; results in androgen deficiency in males and androgen excess and estrogen deficiency in females
- 5α-Reductase 2 deficiency: prevents the conversion of testosterone to dihydrotestosterone; causes androgen deficiency in males
- Aromatase deficiency: prevents estrogen synthesis; causes androgen excess in females
- Aromatase excess: causes excessive conversion of androgens to estrogens; results in estrogen excess in both sexes and androgen deficiency in males.

=== Glucocorticoid- and mineralocorticoid-specific ===
- 21-Hydroxylase deficiency: prevents glucocorticoid and mineralocorticoid synthesis; causes androgen excess in females
- 11β-Hydroxylase 1 deficiency: impairs glucocorticoid and mineralocorticoid metabolism; causes glucocorticoid deficiency and mineralocorticoid excess as well as androgen excess in females
- 11β-Hydroxylase 2 deficiency: impairs corticosteroid metabolism; results in excessive mineralocorticoid activity
- 18-Hydroxylase deficiency: prevents mineralocorticoid synthesis; results in mineralocorticoid deficiency
- 18-Hydroxylase overactivity: impairs mineralocorticoid metabolism; results in mineralocorticoid excess

=== Miscellaneous ===
In addition, several conditions of abnormal steroidogenesis due to genetic mutations in receptors, as opposed to enzymes, also exist, including:

- Gonadotropin-releasing hormone (GnRH) insensitivity: prevents synthesis of sex steroids by the gonads in both sexes
- Follicle-stimulating (FSH) hormone insensitivity: prevents synthesis of sex steroids by the gonads in females; merely causes problems with fertility in males
- Luteinizing hormone (LH) insensitivity: prevents synthesis of sex steroids by the gonads in males; merely causes problems with fertility in females
- Luteinizing hormone (LH) oversensitivity: causes androgen excess in males, resulting in precocious puberty; females are asymptomatic

No activating mutations of the GnRH receptor in humans have been described in the medical literature, and only one of the FSH receptor has been described, which presented as asymptomatic.

== See also ==
- Inborn error of metabolism
- Disorders of sex development
- Congenital adrenal hyperplasia
- Adrenal insufficiency
- Hypogonadism (hypoandrogenism and hypoestrogenism)
- Hypergonadism (hyperandrogenism and hyperestrogenism)
- Delayed puberty and precocious puberty
- Intersex
- Steroid hormone
- Corticosteroid (glucocorticoid, mineralocorticoid)
- Sex steroid (androgen, estrogen, and progestogen)
- Neuroactive steroid
- Hypothalamus and pituitary gland
- Adrenal cortex and gonad (testicle and ovary)
- HPA axis and HPG axis
