= Hypoestrogenism =

Lack of estrogen in the body

- Other names: Estrogen deficiency
- Specialty: Gynecology

Hypoestrogenism, or estrogen deficiency, refers to a lower than normal level of estrogen. It is an umbrella term used to describe estrogen deficiency in various conditions. Estrogen deficiency is also associated with an increased risk of cardiovascular disease, and has been linked to diseases like urinary tract infections and osteoporosis.

In women, low levels of estrogen may cause symptoms such as hot flashes, sleeping disturbances, decreased bone health, and changes in the genitourinary system. Hypoestrogenism is most commonly found in women who are postmenopausal, have primary ovarian insufficiency (POI), or are presenting with amenorrhea (absence of menstrual periods). Hypoestrogenism includes primarily genitourinary effects, including thinning of the vaginal tissue layers and an increase in vaginal pH. With normal levels of estrogen, the environment of the vagina is protected against inflammation, infections, and sexually transmitted infections. Hypoestrogenism can also occur in men, for instance due to hypogonadism.

There are both hormonal and non-hormonal treatments to prevent the negative effects of low estrogen levels and improve quality of life.

== Signs and symptoms ==
=== Vasomotor ===
Presentations of low estrogen levels include hot flashes, which are sudden, intense feelings of heat predominantly in the upper body, causing the skin to redden as if blushing. They are believed to occur due to the narrowing of the thermonuclear zone in the hypothalamus, making the body more sensitive to body temperature changes. Night disturbances are also common symptoms associated with hypoestrogenism. People may experience difficulty falling asleep, waking up several times a night, and early awakening with different variability between races and ethnic groups.

=== Genitourinary ===
Other classic symptoms include both physical and chemical changes of the vulva, vagina, and lower urinary tract. Genitals go through atrophic changes such as losing elasticity, losing vaginal rugae, and increasing of vaginal pH, which can lead to changes in the vaginal flora and increase the risk of tissue fragility and fissure. Other genital signs include dryness or lack of lubrication, burning, irritation, discomfort or pain, as well as impaired function. Low levels of estrogen can lead to limited genital arousal and cause dyspareunia, or painful sexual intercourse because of changes in the four layers of the vaginal wall. People with low estrogen will also experience higher urgency to urinate and dysuria, or painful urination. Hypoestrogenism is also considered one of the major risk factors for developing uncomplicated urinary tract infection in postmenopausal women who do not take hormone replacement therapy.

=== Bone health ===
Estrogen contributes to bone health in several ways; low estrogen levels increase bone resorption via osteoclasts and osteocytes, cells that help with bone remodeling, making bones more likely to deteriorate and increase risk of fracture. The decline in estrogen levels can ultimately lead to more serious illnesses, such as scoliosis or type I osteoporosis, a disease that thins and weakens bones, resulting in low bone density and fractures. Estrogen deficiency plays an important role in osteoporosis development for both genders, and it is more pronounced for women and at younger (menopausal) ages by five to ten years compared with men. Females are also at higher risk for osteopenia and osteoporosis.

== Causes ==
A variety of conditions can lead to hypoestrogenism: menopause is the most common. Primary ovarian insufficiency (premature menopause) due to varying causes, such as radiation therapy, chemotherapy, or a spontaneous manifestation, can also lead to low estrogen and infertility.

Hypogonadism (a condition where the gonads – testes for men and ovaries for women – have diminished activity) can decrease estrogen. In primary hypogonadism, elevated serum gonadotropins are detected on at least two occasions several weeks apart, indicating gonadal failure. In secondary hypogonadism (where the cause is hypothalamic or pituitary dysfunction) serum levels of gonadotropins may be low.

Other causes include certain medications, gonadotropin insensitivity, inborn errors of steroid metabolism (for example, aromatase deficiency, 17α-hydroxylase deficiency, 17,20-lyase deficiency, 3β-hydroxysteroid dehydrogenase deficiency, and cholesterol side-chain cleavage enzyme or steroidogenic acute regulatory protein deficiency) and functional amenorrhea.

=== Risks ===
Low endogenous estrogen levels can elevate the risk of cardiovascular disease in women who reach early menopause. Estrogen is needed to relax arteries using endothelial-derived nitric oxide resulting in better heart health by decreasing adverse atherogenic effects. Women with POI may have an increased risk of cardiovascular disease due to low estrogen production.

== Pathophysiology ==
Estrogen deficiency has both vaginal and urologic effects; the female genitalia and lower urinary tract share common estrogen receptor function due to their embryological development. Estrogen is a vasoactive hormone (one that affects blood pressure) which stimulates blood flow and increases vaginal secretions and lubrication. Activated estrogen receptors also stimulate tissue proliferation in the vaginal walls, which contribute to the formation of rugae. This rugae aids in sexual stimulation by becoming lubricated, distended, and expanded.

Genitourinary effects of low estrogen include thinning of the vaginal epithelium, loss of vaginal barrier function, decrease of vaginal folding, decrease of the elasticity of the tissues, and decrease of the secretory activity of the Bartholin glands, which leads to traumatization of the vaginal mucosa and painful sensations. This thinning of the vaginal epithelium layers can increase the risk of developing inflammation and infection, such as urinary tract infection.

The vagina is largely dominated by bacteria from the genus Lactobacillus, which typically comprise more than 70% of the vaginal bacteria in women. These lactobacilli process glycogen and its breakdown products, which result in a maintained low vaginal pH. Estrogen levels are closely linked to lactobacilli abundance and vaginal pH, as higher levels of estrogen promote thickening of the vaginal epithelium and intracellular production of glycogen. This large presence of lactobacilli and subsequent low pH levels are hypothesized to benefit women by protecting against sexually transmitted pathogens and opportunistic infections, and therefore reducing disease risk.

== Diagnosis ==
Hypoestrogenism is typically found in menopause and aids in diagnosis of other conditions such as POI and functional amenorrhea. Estrogen levels can be tested through several laboratory tests: vaginal maturation index, progestogen challenge test, and vaginal swabs for small parabasal cells.

=== Menopause ===
Menopause is usually diagnosed through symptoms of vaginal atrophy, pelvic exams, and taking a comprehensive medical history consisting of last menstruation cycle. There is no definitive testing available for determining menopause as the symptom complex is the primary indicator and because the lower levels of estradiol are harder to accurately detect after menopause. However, there can be laboratory tests done to differentiate between menopause and other diagnoses.

=== Functional hypothalamic amenorrhea ===
Functional hypothalamic amenorrhea (FHA) is diagnosed based on findings of amenorrhea lasting three months or more, low serum hormone of gonadotropins and estradiol. Since common causes of FHA include exercising too much, eating too little, or being under too much stress, diagnosis of FHA includes assessing for any changes in exercise, weight, and stress. In addition, evaluation of amenorrhea includes a history and physical examination, biochemical testing, imaging, and measuring estrogen level. Examination of menstrual problems and clinical tests to measure hormones such as serum prolactin, thyroid-stimulating hormone, and follicle-stimulating hormone (FSH) can help rule out other potential causes of amenorrhea. These potential conditions include hyperprolactinemia, POI, and polyendocrine metabolic ovarian syndrome.

=== Primary ovarian insufficiency ===
Primary ovarian insufficiency, also known as premature ovarian failure, can develop in women before the age of forty as a consequence of hypergonadotropic hypogonadism. POI can present as amenorrhea and has similar symptoms to menopause, but measuring FSH levels is used for diagnosis.

== Treatment ==
Hormone replacement therapy (HRT) can be used to treat hypoestrogenism and menopause related symptoms, and low estrogen levels in both premenopausal and postmenopausal women. Low-dose estrogen medications are approved by the U.S. Food and Drug Administration for treatment of menopause-related symptoms. HRT can be used with or without a progestogen to improve symptoms such as hot flashes, sweating, trouble sleeping, vaginal dryness and discomfort. The FDA recommends HRT to be avoided in women with a history or risk of breast cancer, undiagnosed genital bleeding, untreated high blood pressure, unexplained blood clots, or liver disease.

HRT for the vasomotor symptoms of hypoestrogenism include different forms of estrogen, such as conjugated equine estrogens, 17β-estradiol, transdermal estradiol, ethinyl estradiol, and the estradiol ring. In addition to HRT, there are common progestogens that are used to protect the inner layer of the uterus, the endometrium. These medications include medroxyprogesterone acetate, progesterone, norethisterone acetate, and drospirenone.

Non-pharmacological treatment of hot flashes includes using portable fans to lower the room temperature, wearing layered clothing, and avoiding tobacco, spicy food, alcohol and caffeine. There is a lack of evidence to support other treatments such as acupuncture, yoga, and exercise to reduce symptoms.

== In men ==
Estrogens are also important in male physiology. Hypoestrogenism can occur in men due to hypogonadism. Very rare causes include aromatase deficiency and estrogen insensitivity syndrome. Medications can also be a cause of hypoestrogenism in men. Hypoestrogenism in men can lead to osteoporosis, among other symptoms. Estrogens may also be positively involved in sexual desire in men.

== See also ==
- Estrogen insensitivity syndrome
- Aromatase excess syndrome
