= Follicle-stimulating hormone insensitivity =

- Other names: Ovarian insensitivity to FSH, Granulosa cell hypoplasia

Follicle-stimulating hormone (FSH) insensitivity, or ovarian insensitivity to FSH in females, also referable to as ovarian follicle hypoplasia or granulosa cell hypoplasia in females, is a rare autosomal recessive genetic and endocrine syndrome affecting both females and males, with the former presenting with much greater severity of symptomatology. It is characterized by a resistance or complete insensitivity to the effects of follicle-stimulating hormone (FSH), a gonadotropin which is normally responsible for the stimulation of estrogen production by the ovaries in females and maintenance of fertility in both sexes. The condition manifests itself as hypergonadotropic hypogonadism (decreased or lack of production of sex steroids by the gonads despite high circulating levels of gonadotropins), reduced or absent puberty (lack of development of secondary sexual characteristics, resulting in sexual infantilism if left untreated), amenorrhea (lack of menstruation), and infertility in females, whereas males present merely with varying degrees of infertility and associated symptoms (e.g., decreased sperm production).

A related condition is luteinizing hormone (LH) insensitivity (termed Leydig cell hypoplasia when it occurs in males), which presents with similar symptoms to those of FSH insensitivity but with the symptoms in the respective sexes reversed (i.e., hypogonadism and sexual infantilism in males and merely problems with fertility in females). For individuals with XY feminized or ambiguous genitalia are common, whereas ambiguous genitalia does not occur in females with FSH insensitivity. Despite their similar causes, LH insensitivity is considerably more common in comparison to FSH insensitivity.

== Signs and symptoms ==
In females, FSH insensitivity results in diminished development of ovarian follicles and granulosa cells and low to normal estrogen levels, elevated to very elevated gonadotropin levels, and low inhibin B levels, whereas males present with diminished Sertoli cell proliferation and moderately elevated FSH levels, normal to slightly elevated LH levels, normal testosterone levels, and reduced inhibin B levels.

Due in part to elevated LH levels, which stimulate androgen production by theca cells in the ovaries, and due in part to FSH insensitivity, resulting in a lack of aromatase in nearby granulosa cells that normally convert androgens into estrogens, it could be expected that females with FSH insensitivity might present with symptoms of hyperandrogenism at puberty. However, this has not been found to be the case. This may be in part because FSH, via stimulation of granulosa cells and the resultant secretion of yet-unidentified paracrine factors (but possibly including inhibin B), has been shown to significantly enhance the LH-mediated stimulation of androgen production by theca cells. In addition, theca cells predominantly secrete the relatively weak androgen androstenedione, whereas granulosa cells, signaled to do so by FSH under normal circumstances, convert androstenedione into its more potent relative testosterone (which is subsequently converted into estradiol). Hence, in females, FSH insensitivity may not only result in deficiencies in estrogen production by granulosa cells, but in diminished androgen synthesis by both theca and granulosa cells as well, which could potentially explain why hyperandrogenism does not occur.

FSH insensitivity presents itself in females as two clusters of symptoms: 1) hypergonadotropic hypogonadism or hypoestrogenism, resulting in a delayed, reduced, or fully absent puberty and associated sexual infantilism (if left untreated), reduced uterine volume, and osteoporosis; and 2) ovarian dysgenesis or failure, resulting in primary or secondary amenorrhea, infertility, and normal sized to slightly enlarged ovaries. Males on the other hand are significantly less affected, presenting merely with partial or complete infertility, reduced testicular volume, and oligozoospermia (reduced spermatogenesis).

== Cause ==
FSH insensitivity is caused by inactivating mutations of the follicle-stimulating hormone receptor (FSHR) and thus an insensitivity of the receptor to FSH. This results in an inability of the granulosa cells in ovarian follicles to respond to FSH in females, in turn resulting in diminished estrogen production by the ovaries and loss of menstrual cycles, and an inability of Sertoli cells in the seminiferous tubules of the testicles to respond to FSH in males, which in turn results in impaired spermatogenesis.

== Treatment ==
Hormone replacement therapy with estrogen may be used to treat symptoms of hypoestrogenism in females with the condition. There are currently no known treatments for the infertility caused by the condition in either sex.

== See also ==
- Hypogonadism and hypergonadotropic hypogonadism
- Gonadal dysgenesis and premature ovarian failure
- Leydig cell hypoplasia (or LH insensitivity)
- Gonadotropin-releasing hormone insensitivity
- Inborn errors of steroid metabolism
- Isolated 17,20-lyase deficiency
- Combined 17α-hydroxylase/17,20-lyase deficiency
- 17β-Hydroxysteroid dehydrogenase III deficiency
- Aromatase deficiency and estrogen insensitivity syndrome
