= Leydig cell hypoplasia =

- Other names: 46,XY DSD due to luteinizing hormone resistance or luteinizing hormone beta subunit deficiency
- This condition is inherited in an autosomal recessive manner

Leydig cell hypoplasia (or aplasia) (LCH), also known as Leydig cell agenesis, is a rare autosomal recessive genetic and endocrine syndrome affecting an estimated 1 in 1,000,000 individuals with XY chromosomes. It is characterized by an inability of the body to respond to luteinizing hormone (LH), a gonadotropin which is normally responsible for signaling Leydig cells of the testicles to produce testosterone and other androgen sex hormones. The condition manifests itself as pseudohermaphroditism (partially or fully underdeveloped genitalia), hypergonadotropic hypogonadism (decreased or lack of production of sex steroids by the gonads despite high circulating levels of gonadotropins), reduced or absent puberty (lack of development of secondary sexual characteristics, resulting in sexual infantilism if left untreated), and infertility.

Leydig cell hypoplasia does not occur in people with XX chromosomes as they do not have either Leydig cells or testicles. However, the cause of the condition in people with XY chromosomes, luteinizing hormone insensitivity, does affect people with XX chromosomes, and because LH plays a role in the female reproductive system, it can result in primary amenorrhea or oligomenorrhea (absent or reduced menstruation), infertility due to anovulation, and ovarian cysts.

A related condition is follicle-stimulating hormone (FSH) insensitivity, which presents with similar symptoms to those of Leydig cell hypoplasia but with the symptoms in the respective sexes reversed (i.e., hypogonadism and sexual infantilism in XX individuals and difficulties with fertility in XY individuals). Despite their similar causes, FSH insensitivity is considerably less common in comparison to LH insensitivity.

== Symptoms and signs ==
The symptoms of Leydig cell hypoplasia include pseudohermaphroditism, i.e., feminized, ambiguous, or relatively mildly underdeveloped (e.g., micropenis, severe hypospadias, and/or cryptorchidism [undescended testes]) external genitalia, a female gender identity or gender variance, hypergonadotropic hypogonadism (hypogonadism despite high levels of gonadotropins), delayed, impaired, or fully absent puberty with an associated reduction in or complete lack of development of secondary sexual characteristics (sexual infantilism), impaired fertility or complete sterility, tall stature (due to delayed epiphyseal closure), eunuchoid skeletal proportions, delayed or absent bone maturation, and osteoporosis.

== Cause ==
A 46,XY (genetically "male") woman with complete insensitivity to LH, resulting in fully feminized genitalia at birth. Puberty appears to have commenced, likely due to estrogen replacement therapy.

Leydig cell hypoplasia is caused by genetic mutations in LHCGR, a gene which encodes the LH/hCG receptor. LH normally acts through the LH/hCG receptor to stimulate the growth of Leydig cells in the testicles and the production of androgens such as testosterone and dihydrotestosterone (DHT) by these cells. In Leydig cell hypoplasia however, there is a reduced capacity for the LH/hCG receptor to respond to LH. This results in hypoplasia or absence of Leydig cells, testicular atrophy, and lower than normal androgen levels. In the most severe form of the condition in which there is a complete lack of response of the Leydig cells to LH, androgen production by the testicles is virtually negligible and secondary sexual characteristics entirely fail to develop at puberty.

== Diagnosis ==
Since the Sertoli cells are not affected by Leydig cell hypoplasia, anti-Müllerian hormone is secreted normally and so there are no Müllerian structures. Wolffian structures, such as the prostate, vasa deferentia, and epidydimides are present. In type I, abdominal testes are revealed on ultrasound; in type II testes may be descended or undescended.

People with Leydig cell hypoplasia type I display no response to the hCG stimulation test; there is no increase in serum levels of testosterone and dihydrotestosterone. Leydig cell hypoplasia type II range from displaying no response, a slight rise, or a complete response to hCG stimulation.

In any case, the diagnosis is confirmed on biopsy of the testes, revealing either absent or hypoplastic Leydig cells. The inside of the testis will be grayish and mucous, displaying arrested spermatogenesis and the presence of Sertoli cells. The diagnosis can also be confirmed by looking for mutations in the gene for the LH receptor.

A diagnosis of Leydig cell hypoplasia is usually made in the neonatal period, following the discovery of ambiguous genitalia, or at puberty, when secondary sex characteristics fail to develop. Puberty is the most common time for Leydig cell hypoplasia to be diagnosed.

== Treatment ==
Patients with Leydig cell hypoplasia may be treated with hormone replacement therapy (i.e., with androgens), which will result in normal sexual development and the resolution of most symptoms. In the case of 46,XY (genetically "male") individuals who are phenotypically female and/or have a female gender identity, estrogens are recommended instead. Surgical correction of the genitals in individuals with male gender identity may be required, and, if necessary, an orchidopexy (relocation of the undescended testes to the scrotum) may be performed as well.

== See also ==
- Disorders of sex development
- Intersexuality, pseudohermaphroditism, and ambiguous genitalia
- Hypogonadism and hypogonadotropic hypogonadism
- Familial male-limited precocious puberty (or LH oversensitivity)
- Follicle-stimulating hormone insensitivity
- Gonadotropin-releasing hormone insensitivity
- Inborn errors of steroid metabolism
- Isolated 17,20-lyase deficiency
- Combined 17α-hydroxylase/17,20-lyase deficiency
- 17β-Hydroxysteroid dehydrogenase III deficiency
- Androgen insensitivity syndrome
