= Gonadotropin insensitivity =

Medical condition

Gonadotropin insensitivity includes:

- Luteinizing hormone insensitivity
- Follicle-stimulating hormone insensitivity

== See also ==
- Gonadotropin-releasing hormone insensitivity
