= Gonadotropin-resistant ovary syndrome =

Resistant ovary syndrome, previously known as Savage syndrome, is a cause of ovarian failure that can lead to secondary amenorrhea. Resistant ovaries result from a functional disturbance of the gonadotropin receptors in the ovarian follicles. It may be a cause of primary or secondary amenorrhea and is resistant to exogenous gonadotropin stimulation. Diagnosis of this condition requires that the patient has a normal 46,XX karyotype, normal secondary sexual characteristics, elevated plasma follicle-stimulating hormone and luteinizing hormone – in the menopausal range – and that normal, multiple follicles are seen on ovarian biopsy. Spontaneous reversal of the receptor resistance may occur.
