= Estrogen provocation test =

- Synonyms: Estrogen stimulation test; Estrogen challenge test
- Purpose: Evaluate hypothalamic–pituitary–gonadal function

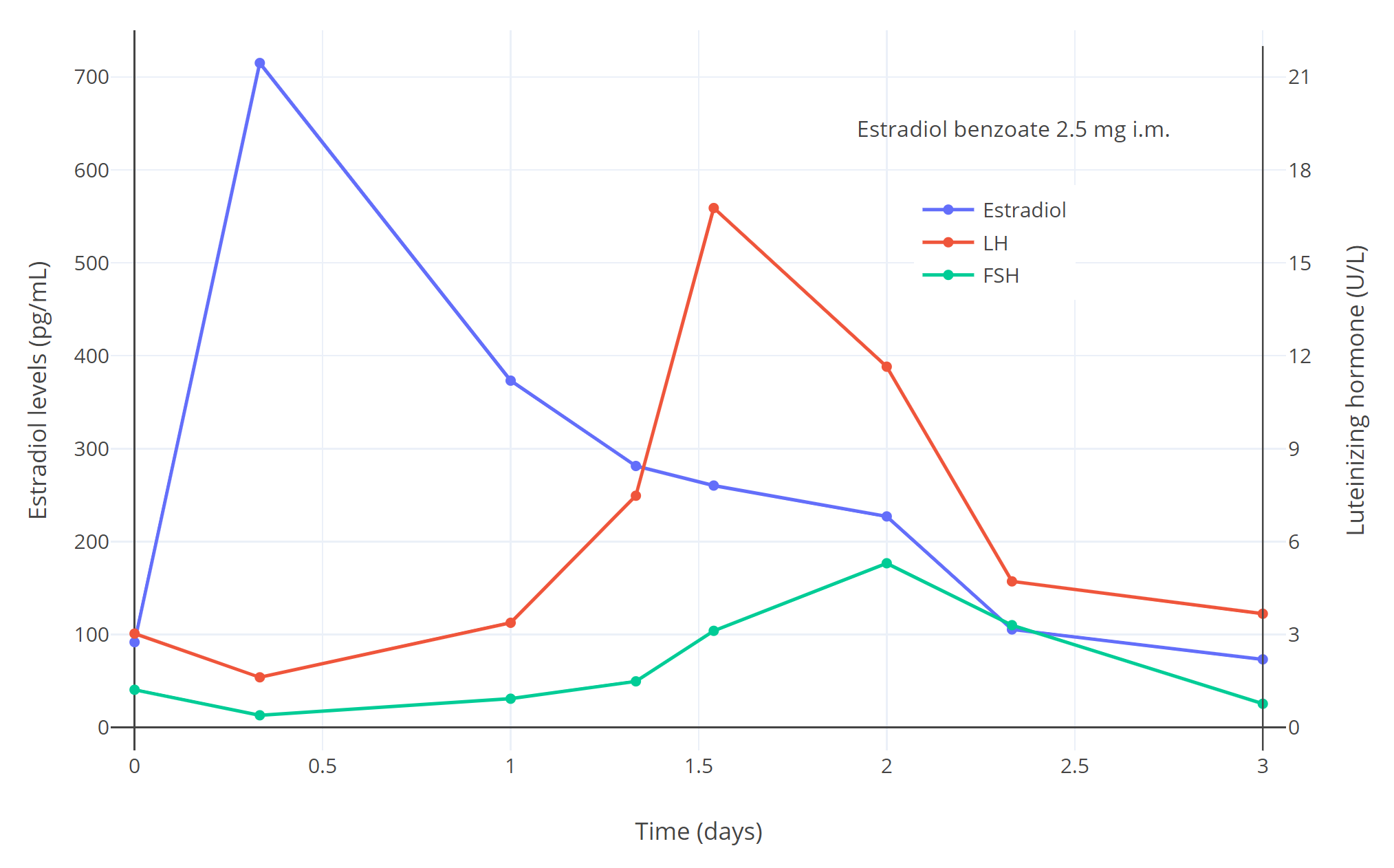
An estrogen provocation test showing gonadotropin surge after a single intramuscular injection of estradiol benzoate early in the menstrual cycle in normal premenopausal women.

The estrogen provocation test, also known as the estrogen stimulation test or estrogen challenge test, is a diagnostic procedure used to evaluate the function of the hypothalamic–pituitary–gonadal axis. It involves the administration of a large amount of estrogen, resulting in estrogenic exposure similar to or greater than normal preovulatory estradiol levels, in an attempt to induce a positive feedback surge in levels of the gonadotropins, luteinizing hormone (LH) and follicle-stimulating hormone (FSH). Estrogens that have been used in the estrogen provocation test include estradiol benzoate, estradiol valerate, ethinylestradiol, and high-dose transdermal estradiol patches. The test involves sustained estrogenic exposure equivalent to estradiol levels of 200 to 300 pg/mL or more for at least 50 hours and results in a surge in gonadotropin levels about 32 to 72 hours following initiation of estrogenic exposure. Levels of LH and FSH increase during the gonadotropin surge by about 10-fold and 4-fold, respectively.

== See also ==
- Progestogen challenge test
- Pharmacodynamics of estradiol § Progonadotropic effects
