= Progesterone test =

Progesterone test may refer to:

- Quantification of the content of progesterone in a sample
- Progestin challenge
