= Sex hormone receptor =

Group of protein families

The sex hormone receptors, or sex steroid receptors, are a group of steroid hormone receptors that interact with the sex hormones, the androgens, estrogens, and progestogens, as well as with sex-hormonal agents such as anabolic steroids, progestins, and antiestrogens. They include the:

- Androgen receptor (AR) (A, B) - binds and is activated by androgens such as testosterone and dihydrotestosterone (DHT)
- Estrogen receptor (ER) (α, β) - binds and is activated by estrogens such as estradiol, estrone, and estriol
- Progesterone receptor (PR) (A, B) - binds and is activated by progestogens such as progesterone

In addition, sex steroids have been found to bind and activate membrane steroid receptors, such as estradiol and GPER.

== See also ==
- Gonadotropin-releasing hormone receptor
- Gonadotropin receptor
- Steroid hormone receptor
