= Progestogen challenge test =

- Synonyms: Progesterone withdrawal test, progestin challenge test, etc.
- Purpose: evaluate a patient who is experiencing amenorrhea

The progestogen challenge test, or progesterone withdrawal test, is a test used in the field of obstetrics and gynecology to evaluate a patient who is experiencing amenorrhea. Due to readily available assays to measure serum estradiol levels, this test is now rarely used.

The test is performed by administering a progestogen, such as progesterone either as an intramuscular injection or oral medroxyprogesterone acetate (Provera). If the patient has sufficient serum estradiol (greater than 50 pg/mL), withdrawal bleeding should occur 2–7 days after the progestin is withdrawn, indicating that the patient's amenorrhea is due to anovulation. However, if no bleeding occurs after progesterone withdrawal, then the patient's amenorrhea is likely to be due to either a) low serum estradiol (i.e. premature ovarian failure), b) hypothalamic-pituitary axis dysfunction (such as low GNRH or low FSH that lead to low estrogen level ), c) a nonreactive endometrium, or d) a problem with the uterine outflow tract, such as cervical stenosis or uterine synechiae (Asherman's syndrome). In order to distinguish between hypoestrogenism or a uterine outflow tract problem/nonreactive endometrium, estrogen may be administered followed by a course of progestin in order to induce withdrawal bleeding. If the patient experiences withdrawal bleeding with the combined estrogen/progestin therapy, then the amenorrhea is likely due to low estrogen.

== See also ==
- Estrogen provocation test
