= Gonadotropin receptor =

Class of receptors

The gonadotropin receptors are a group of receptors that bind a group of peptide hormones called gonadotropins. They include the:

- Follicle-stimulating hormone receptor (FSHR) - binds follicle-stimulating hormone (FSH)
- Luteinizing hormone receptor (LHR) - binds luteinizing hormone (LH) and human chorionic gonadotropin (hCG)

FSHR and LHR are members of the G protein-coupled receptor family. They have important roles in reproduction: FSHR supports the development of ovarian follicles and the production of estrogen in females, and regulates Sertoli cell function and spermatogenesis in males. LHR is involved in ovarian hormone production, ovulation and the function of the corpus luteum, and stimulates testosterone production by Leydig cells. The number of these receptors on cells varies in response to hormonal and reproductive changes.

== See also ==
- GnRH receptor
- Sex hormone receptor
