= Gonadotropin-releasing hormone insensitivity =

- Other names: GnRH insensitivity
- Specialty: Endocrinology

Gonadotropin-releasing hormone (GnRH) insensitivity also known as Isolated gonadotropin-releasing hormone (GnRH) deficiency (IGD) is a rare autosomal recessive genetic and endocrine syndrome which is characterized by inactivating mutations of the gonadotropin-releasing hormone receptor (GnRHR) and thus an insensitivity of the receptor to gonadotropin-releasing hormone (GnRH), resulting in a partial or complete loss of the ability of the gonads to synthesize the sex hormones. The condition manifests itself as isolated hypogonadotropic hypogonadism (IHH), presenting with symptoms such as delayed, reduced, or absent puberty, low or complete lack of libido, and infertility, and is the predominant cause of IHH when it does not present alongside anosmia.

== Signs and symptoms ==
There is a relatively broad spectrum of clinical signs and symptoms that can occur in, ranging from complete absence of sexual development to partial completion of puberty that does not subsequently progress. Of note, the X-linked form of Kallmann syndrome (KS) form of GnRH insensitivity relating to mutations in the ANOS1 gene has the most consistent severe phenotypic presentation (i.e., prepubertal testes size and complete absence of gonadotropin-releasing hormone [GnRH]-induced luteinizing hormone [LH] pulsations during frequency sampling studies) of all of the genes associated with this condition.

GnRH insensitivity can present at any age, but the presenting signs and symptoms are a function of the age-related period of reproductive activity.

During the neonatal period, boys with the more severe cases of GnRH insensitivity can present with microphallus and/or cryptorchidism, presumably due to in utero and/or neonatal GnRH deficiency; approximately one-half of boys with microphallus have GnRH insensitivity as the underlying diagnosis. In comparison, newborn girls with GnRH insensitivity have no obvious abnormal reproductive tract findings that might provide clues to the diagnosis. However, in both sexes, other congenital nonreproductive features may be present (e.g., midline facial defects, skeletal abnormalities).

During childhood, since the hypothalamic GnRH-pituitary-gonadal axis is quiescent, a diagnosis of GnRH insensitivity can generally be heralded only in the presence of nonreproductive phenotypes (e.g., the lack of sense of smell in some patients [anosmia] or skeletal abnormalities, such as cleft lip/cleft palate, hearing deficits, or syndactyly).

At puberty, patients of both sexes can present with a complete form of GnRH insensitivity that is characterized by a failure to initiate sexual maturation (e.g., lack of secondary sexual characteristics, primary amenorrhea in girls, lack of virilization in boys) and failure to establish a pubertal growth spurt.

Some patients present with partial forms of GnRH insensitivity and undergo some degree of pubertal development that subsequently ceases. For example, some males with GnRH insensitivity exhibit some testicular growth, while some females can have thelarche and menarche, but hypogonadotropic hypogonadism (HH) is demonstrable soon thereafter. Extremely rarely, a few have completely normal pubertal development and adulthood gonadal function, only to develop HH with prepubertal levels of testosterone but sometimes with normal testicular size as a clue to its acquired status, i.e., developing only after adult testicular development has been complete subsequently in adulthood, leading to infertility and sexual dysfunction. These patients are referred to as having the adult-onset or acquired form of GnRH insensitivity.

== Causes ==
Congenital Causes

- Genetic Mutations
  - Kallmann syndrome
    - ANOS1 (formerly KAL1), X-linked recessive KS
    - SOX10 (SRY-box 10 gene), autosomal dominant KS with variable penetrance
    - IL17RD, autosomal dominant KS with variable penetrance
    - SEMA3A, autosomal dominant KS with variable penetrance
    - FEZF1, autosomal recessive KS
    - IL17RD, autosomal dominant KS with variable penetrance
  - Digenic and Oligogenic Mutations
    - A heterozygous FGFR1 mutation and heterozygous deletion in the NSMF gene in the anosmic pedigree
    - A compound heterozygous GNRHR mutation and heterozygous FGFR1 mutation in the normosmic pedigree
- GnRH deficiency associated with mental retardation/obesity
- Congenital malformations often associated with craniofacial anomalies
- Laurence-Moon-Biedl syndrome
- Prader-Willi syndrome

Acquired Causes

- Benign tumors and cysts
- Craniopharyngiomas
- Germinomas, meningiomas, gliomas, astrocytomas
- Metastatic tumors (breast, lung, prostate)
- Chronic systemic disease
- Malnutrition, anorexia nervosa, bulimia
- Hypothyroidism, hyperprolactinemia, diabetes mellitus, Cushing's disease
- Post-androgen abuse
- Infiltrative diseases
- Hemochromatosis
- Granulomatous diseases Histiocytosis
- Head trauma
- Pituitary apoplexy
- Drugs - marijuana, opioids, anabolic steroids

== Pathophysiology ==
The genetic mechanisms of gonadotropin-releasing hormone (GnRH) insensitivity involve mutations in at least twenty-four genes regulating GnRH neuronal migration, secretion, and activity. So far, the mechanisms underlying gonadotropin deficiency, both in prepubertal and in adulthood onset forms, remain unknown in most of the cases.

The lack of endogenous hypothalamic gonadotropin-releasing hormone (GnRH) secretion/action in patients with GnRH insensitivity cannot be proven by direct assay of GnRH in the portal circulation but can be reasonably inferred by two findings:

- The lack of any endogenous GnRH-induced luteinizing hormone (LH) pulses during frequent blood sampling
- Typically, most patients respond to exogenous GnRH when administered in a pulsatile regimen designed to mimic endogenous GnRH secretion (GnRH dose and frequency based upon a previous study of LH secretion in normal men) with robust gonadotropin secretion. This responsiveness demonstrates the intact anatomic and functional integrity of the gonadotrophs and the gonads in these patients.

== Diagnosis ==
When suspected on the basis of the clinical presentation or physical findings, the diagnosis of GnRH insensitivity should be confirmed biochemically. The diagnosis requires the following findings:

- The demonstration of prepubertal serum concentrations of sex steroid hormones (serum testosterone less than 100 ng/dL [3.5 nmol/L] in males or serum estradiol less than 20 pg/mL [73 pmol/L] in females).
- Inappropriately low or normal serum luteinizing hormone (LH) and follicle-stimulating hormone (FSH) concentrations (usually less than 4 to 5 international units/L) rather than the high concentrations expected with primary gonadal failure.
- Otherwise normal anterior pituitary function.
- Normal appearance of the hypothalamus and pituitary region on magnetic resonance imaging (MRI); when seeking this diagnosis, it is useful to request fine (1 mm) cuts through the olfactory bulb region of the MRI to define subtle abnormalities of the olfactory system that may signal which genetic tests to request first.
- Differential diagnosis — For patients fulfilling the above laboratory criteria, the main (and most difficult) differential diagnosis is with constitutional delay of growth and puberty (CDGP).
- A definitive diagnosis of GnRH insensitivity in the absence of a family history or prior genetic testing is difficult to make until the patient reaches at least 18 years of age, unless other suggestive features are present (i.e., prior microphallus and/or cryptorchism, anosmia, renal agenesis, skeletal defects, etc.). CDGP is far more common than GnRH insensitivity, affecting approximately 3 percent of adolescents while the incidence of the Kallmann syndrome (KS) form of GnRH insensitivity is 1:48,000 with a clear difference between males (1:30,000) and females (1:125,000).
- No single test can reliably distinguish between GnRH insensitivity and CDGP until more widespread genetic testing becomes available, and therefore, one has to rely on an array of clinical clues as well as on the natural evolution over time. However, certain features may indicate a higher likelihood of GnRH insensitivity rather than CDGP:
- A family history of gonadotropin-releasing hormone (GnRH) deficiency, anosmia, and/or the presence of one or several associated congenital abnormalities suggests congenital nonreproductive abnormalities (e.g., cleft lip/palate, syndactyly) suggest KS form of GnRH deficiency.
- A history of "stalled" puberty rather than total absence of development, a family history of delayed puberty, or early evidence of breast or testicular development are useful indicators that puberty is likely to occur spontaneously (i.e., CDGP).
- The presence of pubic hair suggests GnRH insensitivity because normal adrenarche still occurs; in comparison, both adrenarche and gonadarche are delayed in CDGP, and therefore, pubic hair is usually absent.
- In females, functional hypogonadotropic hypogonadism (FHH) (or functional hypothalamic amenorrhea) is part of the differential diagnosis for GnRH insensitivity. The presence of predisposing factors like excessive exercise, weight loss, or psychological stress point towards the diagnosis of FHH rather than GnRH insensitivity.
- When GnRH deficiency presents after puberty, other causes of secondary hypogonadism (particularly tumors of the hypothalamic-pituitary axis) must be eliminated, as GnRH insensitivity is really a diagnosis of exclusion. These include:
- Tumors of the hypothalamic-pituitary region that occasionally can be suspected by the presence of other neurologic symptoms (headaches, visual disturbances) or the demonstration of other defects or excess in anterior pituitary hormone secretion on initial biochemical screening. However, enlarging mass lesions in either the pituitary or the central nervous system decrease the secretion of corticotropin (ACTH) or thyroid-stimulating hormone (TSH) less than that of gonadotropins or growth hormone.
- Similarly, hemochromatosis should be eliminated by appropriate testing of serum iron, total iron binding capacity, and ferritin levels.

Approach to genetic testing — When the diagnosis of GnRH insensitivity is suspected, it is suggested that referral to a clinical geneticist for further evaluation and possible genetic testing be done. As many of the genes causing GnRH insensitivity have pleotropic physiologic functions, genetic testing can aid assessment of both reproductive and nonreproductive clinical features. In addition, ascertaining the specific inheritance modes can aid genetic screening within the family to predict recurrence risk in siblings, family members or offspring of GnRH insensitivity patients. However, genetic testing in GnRH insensitivity is challenging, given the genetic and allelic heterogeneity, as well as complex oligogenic inheritance patterns. However, in the presence of either clear Mendelian inheritance patterns or specific phenotypic cues, targeted genetic testing or multigene panel testing may be performed. However, if such testing is done, variant interpretation and genetic counseling should be performed in conjunction with a clinical genetics service. Alternatively, several research units have special interests in the genetics of GnRH insensitivity, and clinicians can consider referring these patients to such specialized centers. Genetic testing is now commercially available through several Clinical Laboratory Improvement Amendments (CLIA) laboratories in the United States (GeneDx, Athena Diagnostics, Fulgent Diagnostics).

== Treatment ==
The choice of therapy for GnRH insensitivity depends upon the patient's age and desire to achieve one or more of the following goals:

- Induction of puberty and/or maintenance of sexual maturation
- Induction or restoration of fertility

Puberty induction and sexual maturation

Girls and women — Exogenous estrogens are used to start secondary sexual development in prepubertal girls and to build and sustain normal bone and muscle mass. Initiation of treatment are based upon the patient's bone age, current height percentiles, psychosexual needs, and predicted adult height. The shorter the predicted adult height, the later puberty should be induced. Inappropriate use of estrogens may result in rapid osseous maturation with resulting short stature and irregular menstrual bleeding.

Initiation of puberty can begin with any type or route of exogenous estrogen, oral or transdermal. Initiation of puberty with transdermal 17-beta estradiol, starting with low doses of approximately 0.08 to 0.12 mcg estradiol per kg/day body weight, is successful and commonly prescribed by pediatricians. The dose is then gradually increased over several years. Initial therapy consist of unopposed estrogen alone to maximize breast growth, achieve appropriate skeletal maturation, and to induce uterine and endometrial proliferation. A progestin eventually needs to be added to prevent endometrial hyperplasia, but adding it prematurely or administering combinations of estrogens and progestins (e.g., birth control pills) before completion of breast development should be avoided because it is likely to reduce ultimate breast size.

Once pubertal induction is completed, estrogen and progestin therapy are continued indefinitely. Doses and principles of therapy are similar to those for women with primary ovarian insufficiency.

Boys and men — In boys, puberty can be induced with testosterone, exogenous gonadotropins, or pulsatile gonadotropin-releasing hormone (GnRH) therapy. The latter two options also induce spermatogenesis, which is not necessary for this age group. Testosterone therapy is suggested for pubertal induction in boys. The goals of therapy are to:

- Induce virilization
- Promote optimal skeletal maturation (with bone age monitoring)
- Maximize adult height
- Promote psychosexual development
- Build and sustain normal bone and muscle mass

Oral testosterone preparations should not be used, because of hepatic toxicity. The choices for testosterone replacement include intramuscular injections of long-acting testosterone preparations or topical gels/solutions/patches. Serum testosterone levels should be monitored and dose adjusted.

Whichever form of testosterone replacement is chosen, providing psychological support is important because the patient will have a variety of new and often confusing symptoms, much like an adolescent undergoing puberty but more difficult because it will likely be at a later age. Testosterone therapy should be initiated at a low dose and gradually increased to an adult dose over a few years.

Once pubertal induction is completed, testosterone therapy is continued indefinitely.

== Prognosis ==
The prognosis is generally good, with the outcome for fertility depending on the severity of the sex hormone deficiency and the age of initiation of treatment. Rare cases of complete resolution have been described but the pathophysiology of the disease in these patients is not understood.

== Epidemiology ==
Gonadotropin-releasing hormone (GnRH) insensitivity affects both sexes but has a significant male preponderance. A population-based, epidemiological study from Finland showed a minimal prevalence estimate of the Kallman syndrome (KS) form of Gonadotropin-releasing hormone (GnRH) insensitivity to be 1:48,000 with a clear difference between males (1:30,000) and females (1:125,000).

== Research ==
The research of GnRH deficiency has been long studied over the past five decades. The classic studies from the 1970s identified that pulsatile release of GnRH from the hypothalamus is a prerequisite for physiologic gonadotrope function. Further theses studies demonstrated that the absence, decreased frequency, or decreased amplitude of pulsatile GnRH release results in the clinical syndrome of hypogonadotropic hypogonadism (HH).

Current research primarily aims to define the physiology of GnRH, as it is critical to understanding the clinical heterogeneity of GnRH insufficiency and its comparison to other conditions resulting in hypogonadotropic hypogonadism (HH). Some overall goals of current research have focused on investigating:

- The neuroendocrine control of reproduction and specifically the physiology and pathophysiology of GnRH secretion and action in humans
- Efficacy of genetic counseling and patient management
- The psychopathology, sexuality, and personality characteristics in patients with GnRH deficiency under hormonal replacement therapy

== See also ==
- GnRH and gonadotropins
- Hypogonadotropic hypogonadism
- Hypopituitarism
- Inborn errors of steroid metabolism
- Kallmann syndrome
- Leydig cell hypoplasia
- Sex hormones
