= Cytochrome b5 deficiency =

- Specialty: Endocrinology

Cytochrome b_{5} deficiency is a rare condition and form of isolated 17,20-lyase deficiency caused by deficiency in cytochrome b_{5} type A, a small hemoprotein that acts as an allosteric factor to facilitate the interaction of CYP17A1 (17α-hydroxylase/17,20-lyase) with P450 oxidoreductase (POR), thereby allowing for the 17,20-lyase activity of CYP17A1. The condition affects both adrenal and gonadal androgen biosynthesis and results in male pseudohermaphroditism. The principal biological role of cytochrome b_{5} is reduction of methemoglobin, so cytochrome b_{5} deficiency can also result in elevated methemoglobin levels and/or methemoglobinemia, similarly to deficiency of cytochrome b_{5} reductase (methemoglobin reductase).
