= Luteinizing hormone/choriogonadotropin receptor =

Transmembrane receptor found in humans

LHCGR
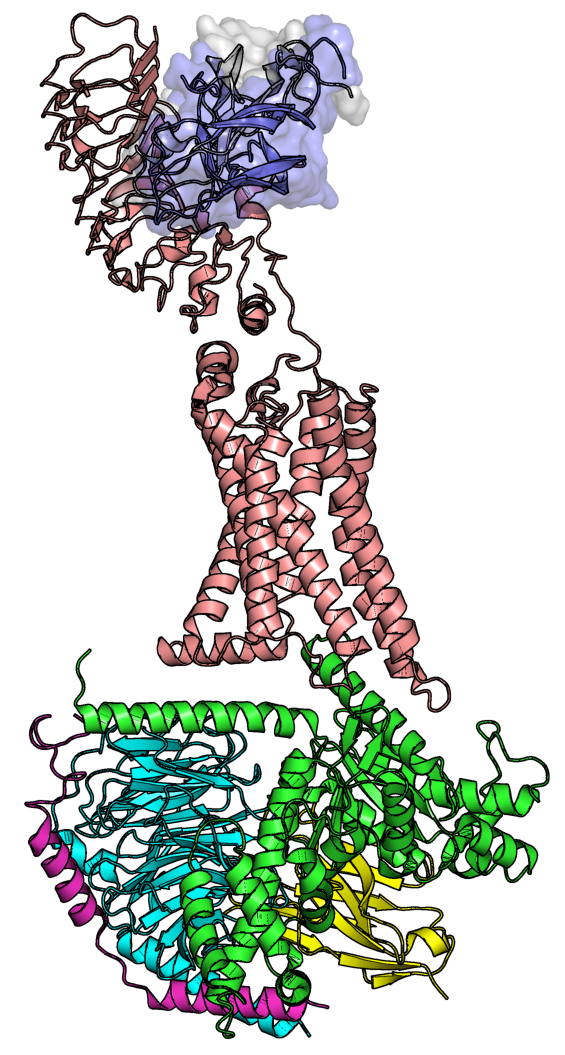

Identifiers
- Aliases: LHCGR, HHG, LCGR, LGR2, LH/CG-R, LH/CGR, LHR, LHRHR, LSH-R, ULG5, Luteinizing hormone/choriogonadotropin receptor
- External IDs: OMIM: 152790; MGI: 96783; GeneCards: LHCGR
Available structures
PDB	Ortholog search: PDBe RCSB
PDB	List of PDB id codes 7FIG, 7FIH, 7FII, 7FIJ

Gene location (Human)
Chr.	Chromosome 2 (human)
Band	2p16.3	Start	48,686,774 bp
Band	2p16.3	End	48,755,730 bp

Gene location (Mouse)
Chr.	Chromosome 17 (mouse)
Band	17 E4|17 58.35 cM	Start	89,023,909 bp
Band	17 E4|17 58.35 cM	End	89,099,418 bp
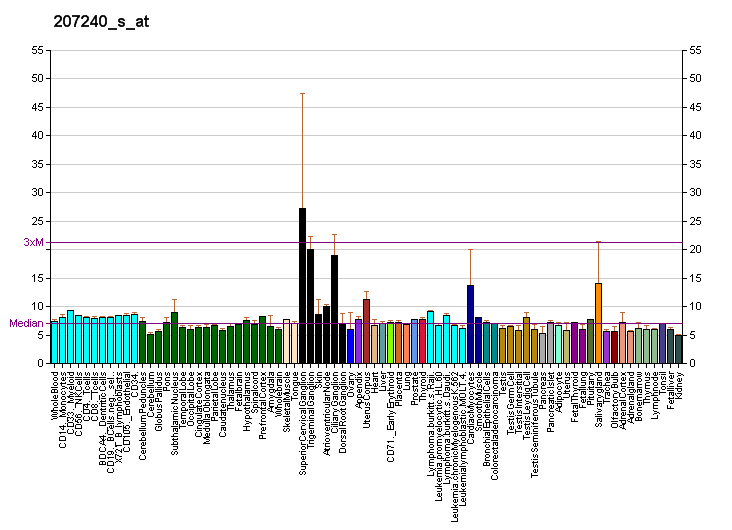
RNA expression pattern
Bgee	Human / Mouse (ortholog); Top expressed in: testicle; sural nerve; gonad; Achilles tendon; left ovary; epithelium of colon; right ovary; adipose tissue; stromal cell of endometrium; subcutaneous adipose tissue / Top expressed in: Gonadal ridge; ovary; basal plate; spermatocyte; testicle; ventricular zone; superior frontal gyrus; rhombencephalon; mesencephalon; central gray substance of midbrain; More reference expression data
BioGPS	More reference expression data
Gene ontology
Molecular function	G protein-coupled peptide receptor activity; G protein-coupled receptor activity; choriogonadotropin hormone binding; signal transducer activity; protein-hormone receptor activity; choriogonadotropin hormone receptor activity; follicle-stimulating hormone receptor activity; luteinizing hormone receptor activity
Cellular component	integral component of membrane; endosome; membrane; integral component of plasma membrane; plasma membrane
Biological process	G protein-coupled receptor signaling pathway; male gonad development; male genitalia development; cognition; G protein-coupled receptor signaling pathway, coupled to cyclic nucleotide second messenger; activation of adenylate cyclase activity; positive regulation of inositol trisphosphate biosynthetic process; hormone-mediated signaling pathway; cellular response to gonadotropin stimulus; signal transduction; primary ovarian follicle growth; phospholipase C-activating G protein-coupled receptor signaling pathway; follicle-stimulating hormone signaling pathway; regulation of osteoclast differentiation; luteinizing hormone signaling pathway; positive regulation of adenylate cyclase activity; cellular response to luteinizing hormone stimulus; adenylate cyclase-activating G protein-coupled receptor signaling pathway; ovulation cycle process
Sources:Amigo / QuickGO
Orthologs
Databases	NCBI: entry; OMA: entry
Species	Human	Mouse
Entrez	3973	16867
Ensembl	ENSG00000138039	ENSMUSG00000024107
UniProt	P22888	P30730
RefSeq (mRNA)	NM_000233	NM_013582; NM_001364898
RefSeq (protein)	NP_000224	NP_038610; NP_001351827
Location (UCSC)	Chr 2: 48.69 – 48.76 Mb	Chr 17: 89.02 – 89.1 Mb
PubMed search
- Wikidata
View/Edit Human	View/Edit Mouse

The luteinizing hormone/choriogonadotropin receptor (LHCGR), also lutropin/choriogonadotropin receptor (LCGR) or luteinizing hormone receptor (LHR), is a transmembrane receptor found predominantly in the ovary and testis, but also many extragonadal organs such as the uterus and breasts. The receptor interacts with both luteinizing hormone (LH) and chorionic gonadotropins (such as hCG in humans) and represents a G protein-coupled receptor (GPCR). Its activation is necessary for the hormonal functioning during reproduction.

== LHCGR gene ==
The gene for the LHCGR is found on chromosome 2 p21 in humans, close to the FSH receptor gene. It consists of 70 kbp (versus 54 kpb for the FSHR). The gene is similar to the gene for the FSH receptor and the TSH receptor.

== Receptor structure ==
The LHCGR consists of 674 amino acids and has a molecular mass of about 85–95 kDA based on the extent of glycosylation.

Like other GPCRs, the LHCG receptor possess seven membrane-spanning domains or transmembrane helices. The extracellular domain of the receptor is heavily glycosylated. These transmembrane domains contain two highly conserved cysteine residues, which build disulfide bonds to stabilize the receptor structure. The transmembrane part is highly homologous with other members of the rhodopsin family of GPCRs. The C-terminal domain is intracellular and brief, rich in serine and threonine residues for possible phosphorylation.

== Ligand binding and signal transduction ==
Upon binding of LH to the external part of the membrane spanning receptor, a transduction of the signal takes place. This process results in the activation of a heterotrimeric G protein. Binding of LH to the receptor shifts its conformation. The activated receptor promotes the binding of GTP to the G protein and its subsequent activation. After binding GTP, the G protein heterotrimer detaches from the receptor and disassembles. The alpha-subunit Gs binds adenylate cyclase and activates the cAMP system.

It is believed that a receptor molecule exists in a conformational equilibrium between active and inactive states. The binding of LH (or CG) to the receptor shifts the equilibrium towards the active form of the receptor. For a cell to respond to LH only a small percentage (≈1%) of receptor sites need to be activated.

=== Phosphorylation by cAMP-dependent protein kinases ===
Cyclic AMP-dependent protein kinases (protein kinase A) are activated by the signal cascade originated by the activation of the G protein Gs by the LHCG-receptor. Activated Gs binds the enzyme adenylate cyclase and this leads to the production of cyclic AMP (cAMP). Cyclin AMP-dependent protein kinases are present as tetramers with two regulatory subunits and two catalytic subunits. Upon binding of cAMP to the regulatory subunits, the catalytic units are released and initiate the phosphorylation of proteins leading to the physiologic action. Cyclic AMP is degraded by phosphodiesterase and release 5’AMP. One of the targets of protein kinase A is the Cyclic AMP Response Element Binding Protein, CREB, which binds DNA in the cell nucleus via direct interactions with specific DNA sequences called cyclic AMP response elements (CRE); this process results in the activation or inactivation of gene transcription.

The signal is amplified by the involvement of cAMP and the resulting phosphorylation. The process is modified by prostaglandins. Other cellular regulators that participate are the intracellular calcium concentration regulated by phospholipase C activation, nitric oxide, and other growth factors.

Other pathways of signaling exist for the LHCGR.

== Action ==
Luteinizing hormone up-regulates cholesterol side chain cleaving enzyme in sensitive tissues, the first step of all human steroidogenesis.

The LHCG receptor's main function is the regulation of steroidogenesis. This is accomplished by increasing the intracellular levels of the enzyme cholesterol side chain cleaving enzyme, a member of the cytochrome P450 family. This leads to increased conversion of cholesterol into androgen precursors required to make many steroid hormones, including testosterone and estrogens.

=== Ovary ===
In the ovary, the LHCG receptor is necessary for follicular maturation and ovulation, as well as luteal function. Its expression requires appropriate hormonal stimulation by FSH and estradiol. The LHCGR is present on granulosa cells, theca cells, luteal cells, and interstitial cells The LCGR is restimulated by increasing levels of chorionic gonadotropins in case a pregnancy is developing. In turn, luteal function is prolonged and the endocrine milieu is supportive of the nascent pregnancy.

=== Testis ===
In the male the LHCGR has been identified on the Leydig cells that are critical for testosterone production, and support spermatogenesis.

Normal LHCGR functioning is critical for male fetal development, as the fetal Leydig cells produce androstenedione which is converted to testosterone in fetal Sertoli cells to induce masculinization.

=== Extragonadal ===
LHCGR have been found in many types of extragonadal tissues, and the physiologic role of some has remained largely unexplored. Thus receptors have been found in the uterus, sperm, seminal vesicles, prostate, skin, breast, adrenals, thyroid, neural retina, neuroendocrine cells, and (rat) brain.

== Receptor regulation ==
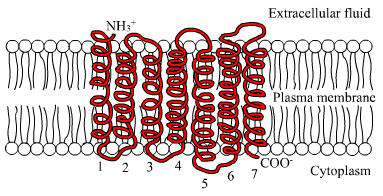
The seven transmembrane α-helix structure of a G protein-coupled receptor such as LHCGR

=== Upregulation ===
Upregulation refers to the increase in the number of receptor sites on the membrane. Estrogen and FSH upregulate LHCGR sites in preparation for ovulation. After ovulation, the luteinized ovary maintains LHCGR s that allow activation in case there is an implantation. Upregulation in males requires gene transcription to synthesize LH receptors within the cell cytoplasm. Some reasons as to why downregulated LH receptors are not upregulated are: lack of gene transcription, lack of RNA to protein conversion and lack of cell membrane targeted shipments from Golgi.

=== Desensitization ===
The LHCGRs become desensitized when exposed to LH for some time. A key reaction of this downregulation is the phosphorylation of the intracellular (or cytoplasmic) receptor domain by protein kinases. This process uncouples Gs protein from the LHCGR.

=== Downregulation ===
Downregulation refers to the decrease in the number of receptor molecules. This is usually the result of receptor endocytosis. In this process, the bound LCGR-hormone complex binds arrestin and concentrates in clathrin coated pits. Clathrin coated pits recruit dynamin and pinch off from the cell surface, becoming clathrin-coated vesicles. Clathrin-coated vesicles are processed into endosomes, some of which are recycled to the cell surface while others are targeted to lysosomes. Receptors targeted to lysosomes are degraded. Use of long-acting agonists will downregulate the receptor population by promoting their endocytosis.

=== Modulators ===
Antibodies to LHCGR can interfere with LHCGR activity.

== LHCGR antagonists and agonists ==
In 2019, the discovery of potent, and selective antagonists of the Luteinizing Hormone Receptor (BAY-298 and BAY-899) were reported which were able to reduce sex hormone levels in vivo.

The first low-molecular-weight agonists of the LHCG receptor were a series of thienopyr(im)idine-based compounds produced by scientists in 2002. This included a more optimized compound, Org 43553, which was shown in human studies to be capable of inducing ovulation. These compounds became the basis for the production a large number of similar, thienopyr(im)idine-based agonists.

== LHCGR abnormalities ==
Loss-of-function mutations in females can lead to infertility. In 46, XY individuals severe inactivation can cause male pseudohermaphroditism, as fetal Leydig cells during may not respond and thus interfere with masculinization. Less severe inactivation can result in hypospadias or a micropenis.

== History ==
Alfred G. Gilman and Martin Rodbell received the 1994 Nobel Prize in Medicine and Physiology for the discovery of the G Protein System.

== Interactions ==
Luteinizing hormone/choriogonadotropin receptor has been shown to interact with GIPC1.
