= Delayed puberty =

- Other names: Late Puberty/ Late Bloomer
- Specialty: Endocrinology
- Causes: Genetic; Malnutrition

Delayed puberty is when a person lacks or has incomplete development of specific sexual characteristics past the usual age of onset of puberty. The person may have no physical or hormonal signs that puberty has begun. The term sexual infantilism has also been used medically as a synonym for delayed puberty.

In the United States, girls are considered to have delayed puberty if they lack breast development by age 13 or have not started menstruating by age 15. Boys are considered to have delayed puberty if they lack enlargement of the testicles by age 14. Delayed puberty affects about 2% of adolescents.

Most commonly, puberty may be delayed for several years and still occur normally, in which case it is considered constitutional delay of growth and puberty, a common variation of healthy physical development. Delay of puberty may also occur due to various causes such as malnutrition, various systemic diseases, or defects of the reproductive system (hypogonadism) or the body's responsiveness to sex hormones.

Initial workup for delayed puberty not due to a chronic condition involves measuring serum FSH, LH, testosterone/estradiol, as well as bone age radiography. If it becomes clear that there is a permanent defect of the reproductive system, treatment usually involves replacement of the appropriate hormones (testosterone/dihydrotestosterone for boys, estradiol and progesterone for girls).

== Timing and definitions ==
Puberty is considered delayed when the child has not begun puberty when two standard deviations or about 95% of children from similar backgrounds have.

In North American girls, puberty is considered delayed when breast development has not begun by age 13, when they have not started menstruating by age 15, and when there is no increased growth rate. Furthermore, slowed progression through the Tanner scale or lack of menarche within 3 years of breast development may also be considered delayed puberty.

In the United States, the age of onset of puberty in girls depends heavily on their racial background. Delayed puberty means the lack of breast development by age 12.8 years for White girls, and by age 12.4 years for Black girls. The lack of menstruation by age 15 in any ethnic background is considered delayed.

In North American boys, puberty is considered delayed when the testes remain less than 2.5 cm in diameter or less than 4 mL in volume by the age of 14. Delayed puberty is more common in males.

Although the absence of pubic and/or axillary hair is common in children with delayed puberty, the presence of sexual hair is due to adrenal sex hormone secretion unrelated to the sex hormones produced by the ovaries or testes.

The age of onset of puberty is dependent on genetics, general health, socioeconomic status, and environmental exposures. Children residing closer to the equator, at lower altitudes, in cities and other urban areas generally begin the process of puberty earlier than their counterparts. Mildly obese to morbidly obese children are also more likely to begin puberty earlier than children of normal weight. Variations in genes related to obesity, such as FTO or NEGRI, have been associated with earlier onset of puberty. Children whose parents started puberty at an earlier age were also more likely to experience it themselves, especially in women where onset of menstruation correlated well between mothers and daughters and between sisters.

== Causes ==
Pubertal delay can be separated into four categories from most to least common:

=== Constitutional and physiologic delay ===
Children who are healthy but have a slower rate of physical development than average have a constitutional delay with a subsequent delay in puberty. It is the most common cause of delayed puberty in girls (30%) and even more so in boys (65%). It is commonly inherited, with as much as 80% of the variation in the age of onset of puberty due to genetic factors. These children have a history of shorter stature than their age-matched peers throughout childhood, but their height is appropriate for bone age, meaning that they have delayed skeletal maturation with potential for future growth.

It is often difficult to establish if it is a true constitutional delay of growth and puberty or if there is an underlying pathology because lab tests are not always discriminatory. In the absence of any other symptoms, short stature, delayed growth in height and weight, and/or delayed puberty may be the only clinical manifestations of certain chronic diseases including coeliac disease.

=== Malnutrition or chronic disease ===
When underweight or sickly children are present with pubertal delay, it is warranted to search for illnesses that cause a temporary and reversible delay in puberty. Chronic conditions such as sickle cell disease and thalassemia, cystic fibrosis, HIV/AIDS, hypothyroidism, chronic kidney disease, and chronic gastroenteric disorders (such as coeliac disease and inflammatory bowel disease) cause a delayed activation of the hypothalamic region of the brain to send signals to start puberty.

Childhood cancer survivors can also present with delayed puberty secondary to their cancer treatments, especially males. The type of treatment, amount of exposure/dosage of drugs, and age during treatment determine the level by which the gonads are affected, with younger patients at a lower risk of negative reproductive effects.

Excessive physical exercise and physical stress, especially in athletes can also delay pubertal onset. Eating disorders such as bulimia nervosa and anorexia nervosa can also impair puberty due to undernutrition.

Carbohydrate-restricted diets for weight loss have also been shown to decrease the stimulation of insulin which in turn does not stimulate kisspeptin neurons, vital in the release of puberty-starting hormones. This shows that carbohydrate restricted children and children with diabetes mellitus type 1 can have delayed puberty.

=== Primary failure of the ovaries or testes (hypergonadotropic hypogonadism) ===
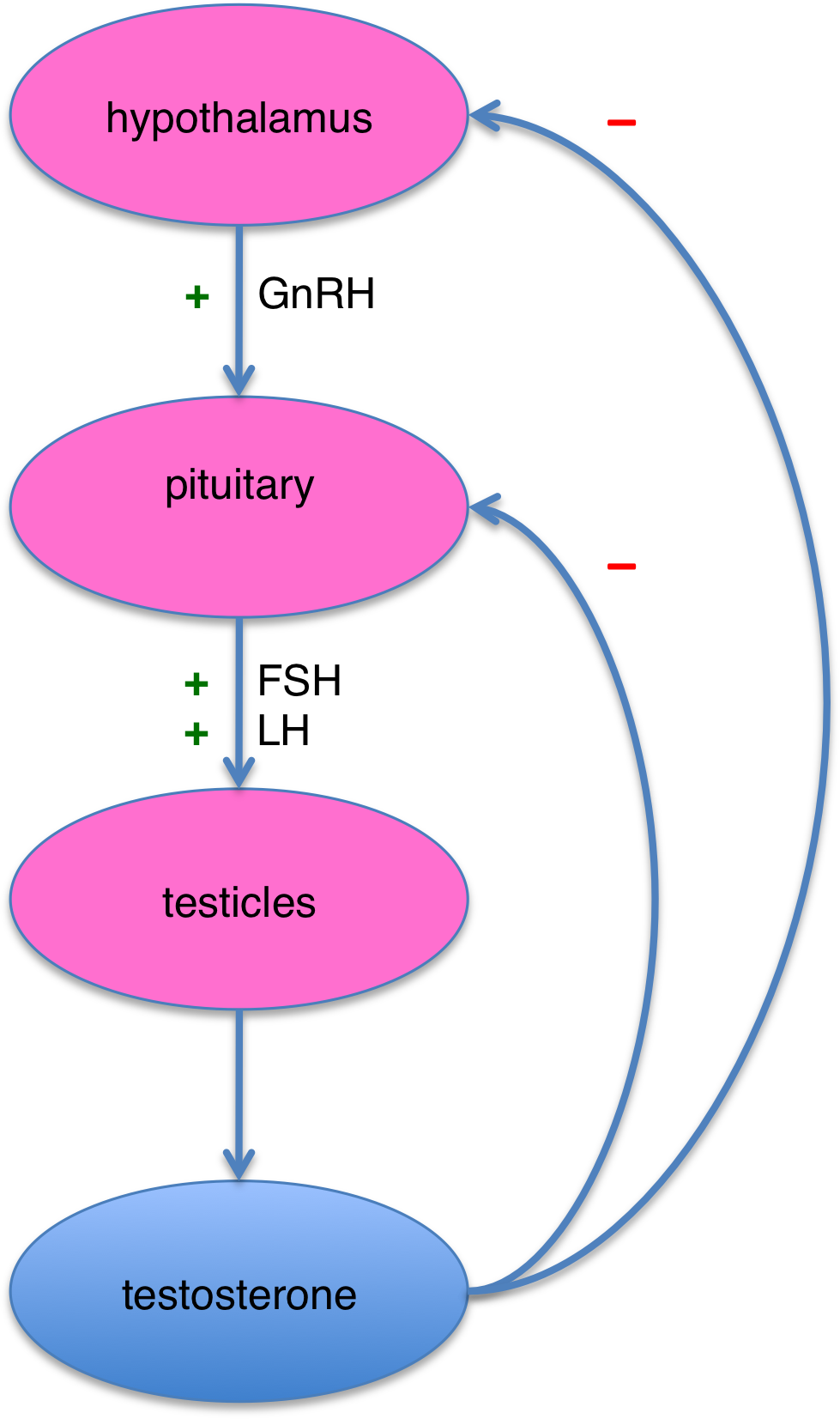
Hypothalamic-pituitary-testicular axis and the hormones produced by each part of the axis. The + signs indicate that the organ is stimulated by the hormones released from the previous organ in the chain.

Primary failure of the ovaries or testes (gonads) will cause delayed puberty due to the lack of hormonal response by the final receptors of the HPG axis. In this scenario, the brain sends a lot of hormonal signals (high gonadotropin), but the gonads are unable to respond to said signals causing hypergonadotropic hypogonadism. Hypergonadotropic hypogonadism can be caused by congenital defects or acquired defects.

==== Congenital disorders ====
Congenital diseases include untreated cryptorchidism where the testicles fail to descend from the abdomen. Other congenital disorders are genetic in nature. In males, there can be deformities in the seminiferous tubule as in Klinefelter syndrome (most common cause in males), defects in the production of testicular steroids, receptor mutations preventing testicular hormones from working, chromosomal abnormalities such as Noonan syndrome, or problems with the cells making up the testes. Females can also have chromosomal abnormalities such as Turner syndrome (most common cause in girls), XX gonadal dysgenesis, and XY gonadal dysgenesis, problems in the ovarian hormone synthesis pathway such as aromatase deficiency or congenital anatomical deformities such as Müllerian agenesis.

==== Acquired disorders ====
Acquired diseases include mumps orchitis, Coxsackievirus B infection, irradiation, chemotherapy, or trauma; all problems causing the gonads to fail.

=== Genetic or acquired defect of the hormonal pathway of puberty (hypogonadotropic hypogonadism) ===
The hypothalamic–pituitary–gonadal axis can also be affected at the level of the brain. The brain does not send its hormonal signals to the gonads (low gonadotropins), causing the gonads to never be activated in the first place, resulting in hypogonadotropic hypogonadism. The HPG axis can be altered in two places, at the hypothalamic or at the pituitary level. CNS disorders such as childhood brain tumors (e.g. craniopharyngioma, prolactinoma, germinoma, glioma) can disrupt the communication between the hypothalamus and the pituitary. Pituitary tumors, especially prolactinomas, can increase the level of dopamine causing an inhibiting effect to the HPG axis. Hypothalamic disorders include Prader-Willi syndrome and Kallmann syndrome, but the most common cause of hypogonadotropic hypogonadism is a functional deficiency in the hormone regulator produced by the hypothalamus, the gonadotropin-releasing hormone or GnRH.

== Diagnosis ==
Pediatric endocrinologists are the physicians with the most training and experience in evaluating delayed puberty. A complete medical history, review of systems, growth pattern, and physical examination, as well as laboratory testing and imaging, will reveal most of the systemic diseases and conditions capable of arresting development or delaying puberty, as well as providing clues to some of the recognizable syndromes affecting the reproductive system.

Timely medical assessment is a necessity since as many as half of girls with delayed puberty have an underlying pathology.

=== History and physical ===
==== Constitutional and physiologic delay ====
Children with constitutional delay are reported to be shorter than their peers, lacking a growth spurt, and having an overall smaller build. Their growth has begun to slow down years before the expected growth spurt secondary to puberty, which helps differentiate a constitutional delay from an HPG-axis related disorder. A complete family history with the ages at which parents hit the pubertal milestones can also provide a reference point for the expected age of puberty. Growth measurement parameters in children with suspected constitutional delay include a height, a weight, the rate of growth, and the calculated mid-parental height which represents the expected adult height for the child.

==== Malnutrition or chronic disease ====
Diet and physical activity habits, as well as history of previous serious illnesses and medication history can provide clues as to the cause of delayed puberty. Delayed growth and puberty can be the first signs of severe chronic illnesses such as metabolic disorders including inflammatory bowel disease and hypothyroidism. Symptoms such as fatigue, pain, and abnormal stooling pattern are suggestive of an underlying chronic condition. Low BMI can lead a physician to diagnose an eating disorder, undernutrition, child abuse, or chronic gastrointestinal disorders.

==== Primary failure of the ovaries or testes ====
A eunuchoid body shape where the arm span exceeds the height by more than 5 cm suggests a delay in growth plate closure secondary to hypogonadism. Turner syndrome has unique diagnostic features including a webbed neck, short stature, shield chest, and low hairline. Klinefelter syndrome presents with tall stature as well as small, firm testes.

==== Genetic or acquired defect of the hormonal pathway of puberty ====
Lacking the sense of smell (anosmia) along with delayed puberty are strong clinical indications for Kallmann syndrome. Deficiencies in GnRH, the signalling hormone produced by the hypothalamus, can cause congenital malformations including cleft lip and scoliosis. The presence of neurological symptoms including headaches and visual disturbances suggest a brain disorder such as a brain tumor causing hypopituitarism. The presence of neurological symptoms in addition to lactation are signs of high prolactin levels and could indicate either a drug side effect or a prolactinoma.

=== Imaging ===
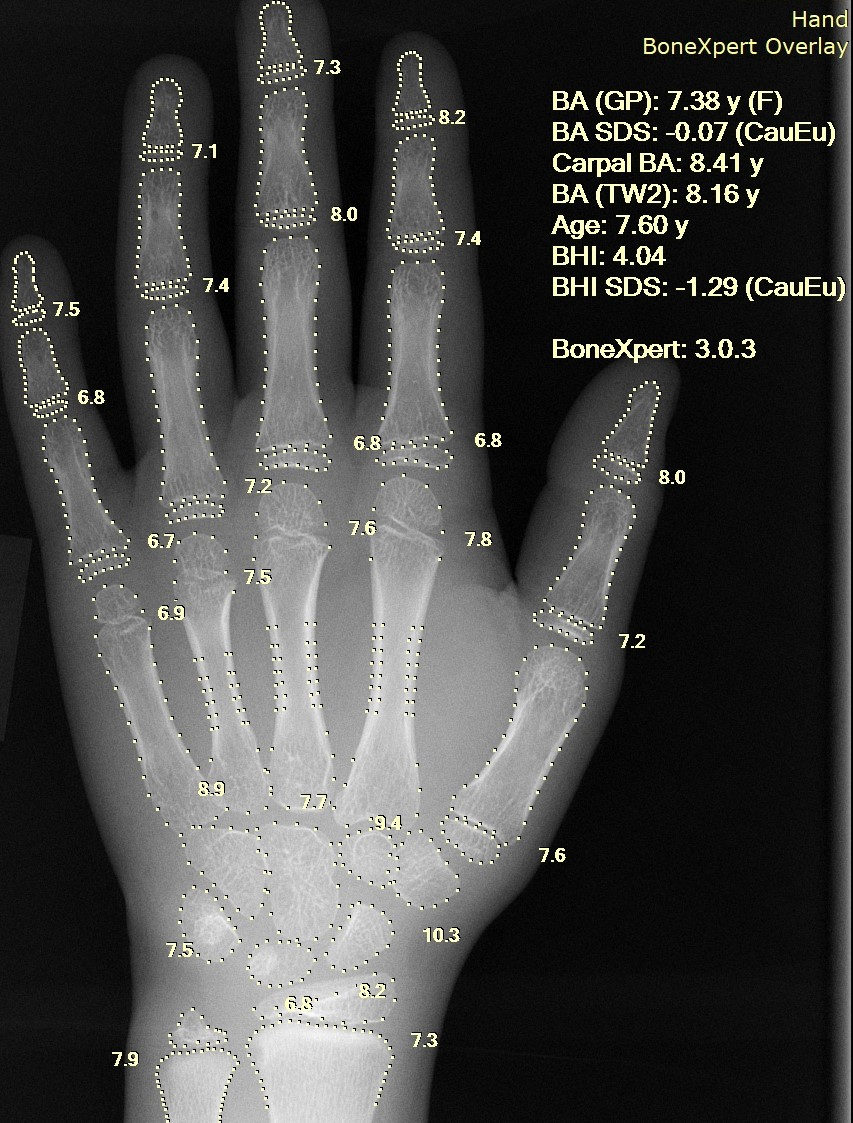
Determination of bone age allows for comparison with chronological age and assessment of future growth potential.

Since bone maturation is a good indicator of overall physical maturation, an X-ray of the left hand and wrist to assess bone age usually reveals whether the child has reached a stage of physical maturation at which puberty should be occurring. X-ray displaying a bone age <11 years in girls or <13 years in boys (despite a higher chronological age) is most often consistent with constitutional delay of puberty. An MRI of the brain should be considered if neurological symptoms are present in addition to delayed puberty, two findings suspicious for pituitary or hypothalamic tumors. An MRI can also confirm the diagnosis of Kallmann syndrome due to the absence or abnormal development of the olfactory tract. However, in the absence of clear neurological symptoms, an MRI may not be the most cost-effective option. A pelvic ultrasound can detect anatomical abnormalities including undescended testes and Müllerian agenesis.

=== Laboratory evaluation ===
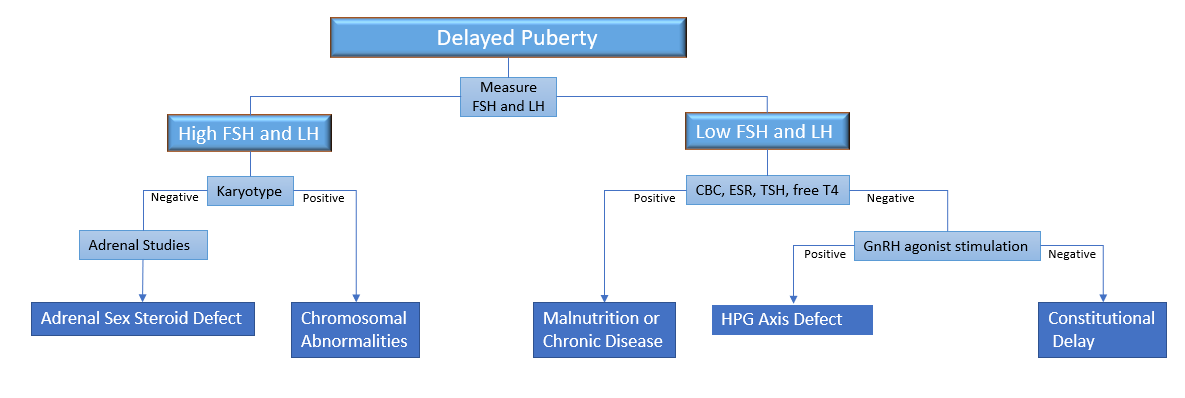
Workup for delayed puberty

The first step in evaluating children with delayed puberty involves differentiating between the different causes of delayed puberty. Constitutional delay can be evaluated with a thorough history, physical, and bone age. Malnutrition and chronic diseases can be diagnosed through history and disease-specific testing. Screening studies include a complete blood count, an erythrocyte sedimentation rate, and thyroid studies. Hypogonadism can be differentiated between hyper- and hypo-gonadotropic hypogonadism by measuring serum follicle-stimulating hormone (FSH) and luteinizing hormone (LH) (gonadotropins to measure pituitary output), and estradiol in girls (to measure gonadal output). By the age of 10–12, children with failure of the ovaries or testes will have high LH and FSH because the brain is attempting to jump-start puberty, but the gonads are not responsive to these signals.

Stimulating the body by administering an artificial version of gonadotropin-releasing hormone (GnRH, the hypothalamic hormone) can differentiate between constitutional delay of puberty and a GnRH deficiency in boys, although no studies have been done in girls to prove this. It is often sufficient to simply measure the baseline gonadotrophin levels to differentiate between the two.

In girls with hypogonadotropic hypogonadism, a serum prolactin level is measured to identify if they have the pituitary tumor prolactinoma. High levels of prolactin would warrant further testing with MRI imaging, except if drugs inducing the production of prolactin can be identified. If the child has any neurological symptoms, it is highly recommended that the physician obtains a head MRI to detect possible brain lesions.

In girls with hypergonadotropic hypogonadism, a karyotype can identify chromosomal abnormalities, the most common of which is Turner syndrome. In boys, a karyotype is indicated if the child may have a congenital gonadal defect such as Klinefelter syndrome. In children with a normal karyotype, defects in the synthesis of the adrenal steroid sex hormones can be identified by measuring 17-hydroxylase, an important enzyme involved in the production of sex hormones.

== Management ==
The goals of short-term hormone therapy are to induce the beginning of sexual development and induce a growth spurt, but it should be limited to children with severe distress or anxiety secondary to their delayed puberty. Bone age must be monitored frequently to prevent precocious closure of the bone plates, thereby stunting growth.

=== Constitutional and physiologic delay ===
If a child is healthy with a constitutional delay of growth and puberty, reassurance and prediction based on the bone age can be provided. No other intervention is usually necessary, but repeat evaluation by measuring serum testosterone or estrogen is recommended. Furthermore, the diagnosis of hypogonadism can be excluded once the adolescent has started puberty by age 16–18.

Boys over 14 years of age whose growth is severely stunted or are experiencing severe distress secondary to their lack of puberty can be started on testosterone to increase their height. Testosterone treatment can also be used to stimulate sexual development, but it can close bone plates prematurely stopping growth altogether if not carefully administered. Another therapeutic option is the use of aromatase inhibitors to inhibit the conversion of androgens to estrogens as estrogens are responsible for stopping bone growth plate development and thus growth. However, due to side effects, therapy with testosterone alone is most often used. Overall, neither growth hormone nor aromatase inhibitors are recommended for constitutional delay to increase growth.

Girls can be started on estrogen with the same goals as their male counterparts.

Overall, studies have shown no significant difference in final adult height between adolescents treated with sex steroids and those who were only observed with no treatment.

=== Malnutrition or chronic disease ===
If the delay is due to systemic disease or malnutrition, the therapeutic intervention is likely to focus direction on those conditions. In patients with coeliac disease, an early diagnosis and the establishment of a gluten-free diet prevents long-term complications and allows restoration of normal maturation. Thyroid hormone therapy will be necessary in the case of hypothyroidism.

=== Primary failure of the ovaries or testes (hypergonadotropic hypogonadism) ===
Whereas children with constitutional delay will have normal levels of sex hormones post-puberty, gonadotropin deficiency or hypogonadism may require lifelong sex steroid replacement.

In girls with primary ovarian failure, estrogen should be started when puberty is supposed to start. Progestins are usually added after there is acceptable breast development, about 12 to 24 months after starting estrogen, as starting treatment with progestin too early can negatively affect breast growth. After acceptable breast growth, administering estrogen and progestin in a cyclical manner can help establish regular menses once puberty is started. The goal is to complete sexual maturation over 2 to 3 years. Once sexual maturation has been achieved, a trial period with no hormonal therapy can determine whether or not the child will require life-long treatment. Girls with congenital GnRH deficiency require enough sex hormone supplementation to maintain body levels in the expected pubertal levels necessary to induce ovulation, especially when fertility is a concern.

Males with primary failure of the testes will be on lifelong testosterone.

Pulsatile GnRH, weekly multi-LH, or hCG and FSH can be used to induce fertility in adulthood for both males and females.

=== Genetic or acquired defect of the hormonal pathway of puberty (hypogonadotropic hypogonadism) ===
Boys aged >12 years old with hypogonadotropic hypogonadism are most often treated with short-term testosterone while males with testicular failure will be on life-long testosterone. Choice of formulation (topical vs injection) is dependent on the child's and family's preference as well as on how well they tolerate side effects. Although testosterone therapy alone will result in the start of puberty, to increase fertility potential, they may need pulsatile GnRH or hCG with rFSH. hCG can be used by itself in boys with spontaneous onset of puberty from non-permanent forms of hypogonadotropic hypogonadism and rFSH can be added in cases of low sperm count after 6 to 12 months of treatment.

If puberty has not started after 1 year of treatment, then permanent hypogonadotropic hypogonadism should be considered.

Girls with hypogonadotropic hypogonadism are started on the same sex steroid therapy as their counterparts with a constitutional delay, however doses are gradually increased to reach full adult replacement levels. Dosage of estrogen is titrated based on the woman's ability to have withdrawal bleeds and to maintain appropriate bone density. Induction of fertility must also be done through pulsatile GnRH.

=== Others ===
Growth hormone is another option that has been described, however it should only be used in proven growth hormone deficiency such as idiopathic short stature. Children with a constitutional delay have not been shown to benefit from growth hormone therapy. Although serum growth hormone levels are low in constitutional delay of puberty, they increase after treatment with sex hormones and in those cases, growth hormone is not suggested to accelerate growth.

Subnormal vitamin A intake is one of the etiological factors in delayed pubertal maturation. Supplementation of both vitamin A and iron to normal constitutionally delayed children with subnormal vitamin A intake is as efficacious as hormonal therapy in the induction of growth and puberty.

More therapies are being developed to target the more discreet modulators of the HPG axis including kisspeptin and neurokinin B.

In cases of severe delayed puberty secondary to hypogonadism, evaluation by a psychologist or psychiatrist, as well as counseling and a supportive environment are an important supplemental therapy for the child. Transition from pediatric to adult care is also vital as many children are lost during transition of care.

== Outlook ==
Constitutional delay of growth and puberty is a variation of normal development with no long-term health consequences, however it can have lasting psychological effects. Adolescent boys with delayed puberty have a higher level of anxiety and depression relative to their peers. Children with delayed puberty also display decreased academic performance in their adolescent education, but changes in academic achievement in adulthood have not been determined.

There is conflicting evidence as to whether or not children with constitutional growth and pubertal delay reach their full height potential. The conventional teaching is that these children catch up on their growth during the pubertal growth spurt and just remain shorter before their delayed puberty starts. However, some studies show that these children fall short of their target height from about 4 to 11 cm. Factors that could affect final height include familial short stature and pre-pubertal growth development.

Pubertal delay can also affect bone mass and subsequent development of osteoporosis. Men with delayed puberty often have low to normal bone mineral density unaffected by androgen therapy. Women are more likely to have lower bone mineral density and thus an increased risk of fractures as early as even before the onset of puberty.

Furthermore, delayed puberty is correlated with a higher risk in cardiovascular and metabolic disorders in women only, but also appears to be protective for breast and endometrial cancer in women and testicular cancer in men.

== See also ==
- Developmental milestones
- Endocrinology
- Puberty
- Constitutional growth delay
- Hypogonadism
- Kallmann syndrome
- Turner syndrome
- Klinefelter syndrome
