= Sex hormone =

Type of steroid hormone

- Drug class
- Estradiol, an important estrogen sex hormone in both women and men

Class identifiers
- Synonyms: Sex steroid; Gonadal steroid
- Use: Various
- Biological target: Sex hormone receptors
- Chemical class: Steroidal; Nonsteroidal

Legal status

Sex hormones, also known as sex steroids, gonadocorticoids and gonadal steroids, are steroid hormones that interact with vertebrate steroid hormone receptors. The sex hormones include androgens, estrogens, and progestogens. Their effects are mediated by slow genomic mechanisms through nuclear receptors as well as by fast nongenomic mechanisms through membrane-associated receptors and signaling cascades. Certain peptide hormones including the luteinizing hormone, follicle-stimulating hormone, and gonadotropin-releasing hormone – each associated with the gonadotropin axis – are usually not regarded as sex hormones, although they play major sex-related roles.

== Production ==
Natural sex hormones are made by the gonads (ovaries or testicles), by adrenal glands, or by conversion from other sex steroids in other tissue such as liver or fat.

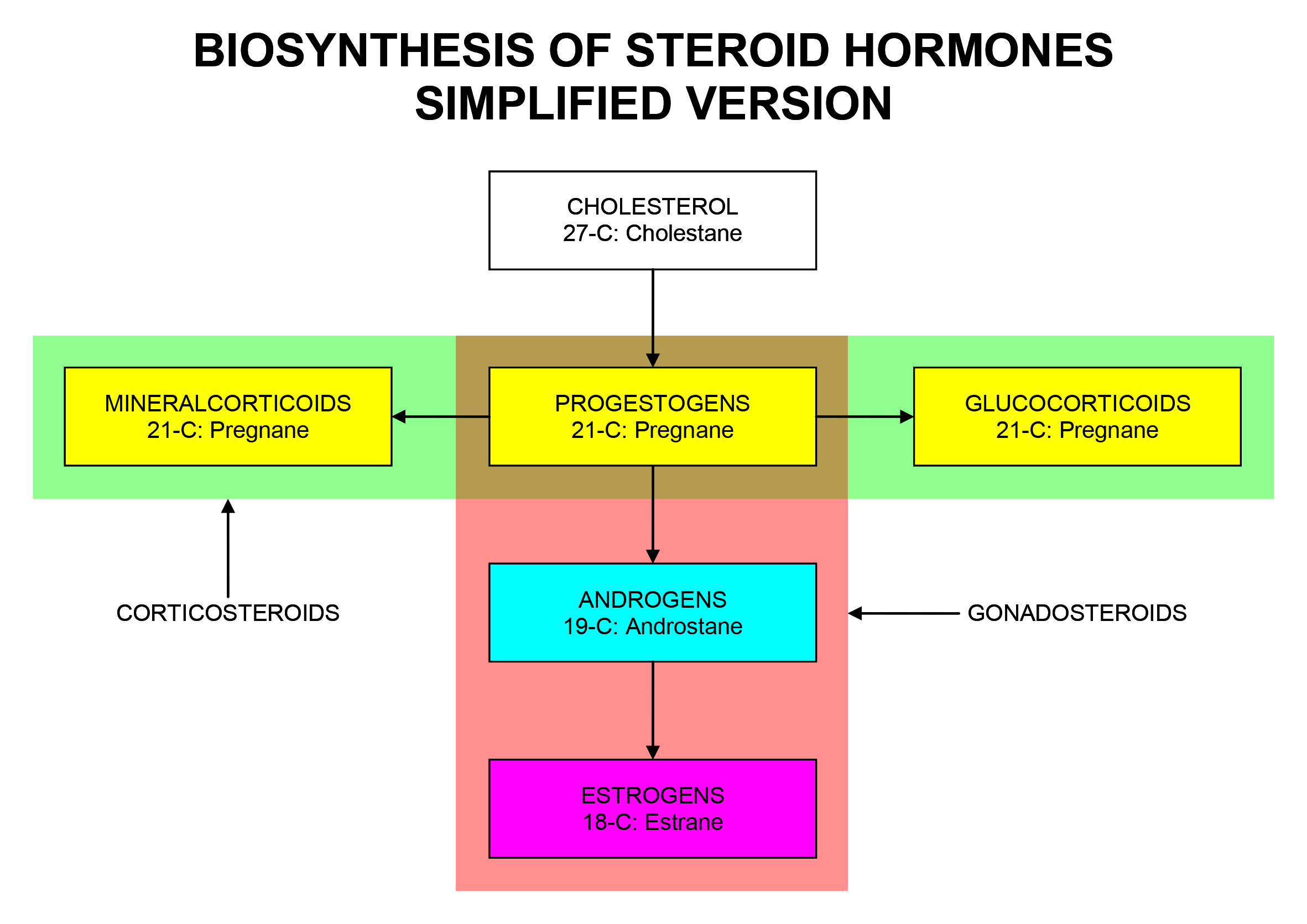

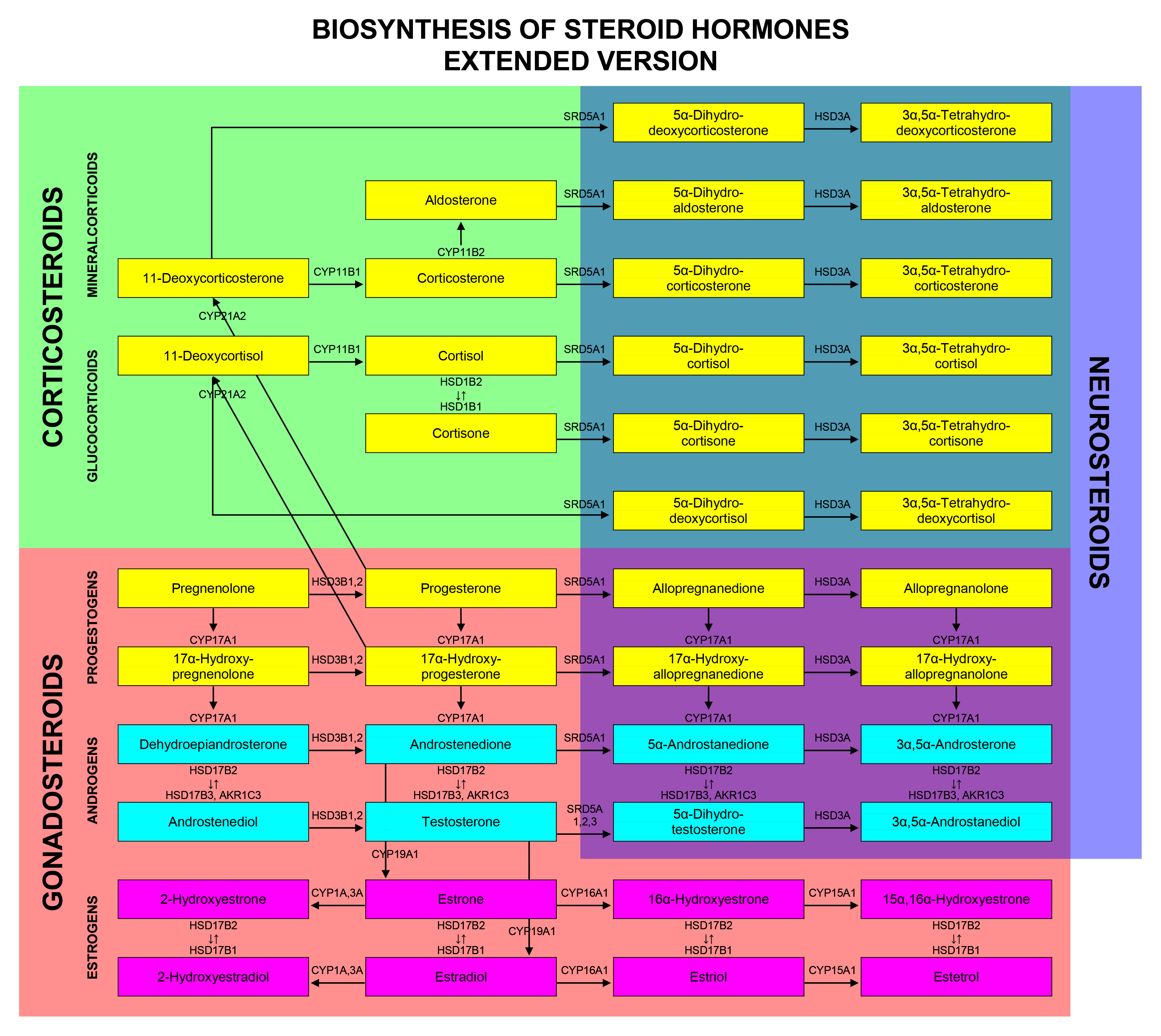

Production rates, secretion rates, clearance rates, and blood levels of major sex hormones
Sex	Sex hormone	Reproductive phase	Blood production rate	Gonadal secretion rate	Metabolic clearance rate	Reference range (serum levels)	
Sex	Sex hormone	Reproductive phase	Blood production rate	Gonadal secretion rate	Metabolic clearance rate	Molar concentration	Mass concentration
Men	Androstenedione	–	2.8 mg/day	1.6 mg/day	2200 L/day	2.8–7.3 nmol/L	80–210 ng/dL
Men	Testosterone	–	6.5 mg/day	6.2 mg/day	950 L/day	6.9–34.7 nmol/L	200–1000 ng/dL
Men	Estrone	–	150 μg/day	110 μg/day	2050 L/day	37–250 pmol/L	10–70 pg/mL
Men	Estradiol	–	60 μg/day	50 μg/day	1600 L/day	<37–210 pmol/L	10–57 pg/mL
Men	Estrone sulfate	–	80 μg/day	Insignificant	167 L/day	600–2500 pmol/L	200–900 pg/mL
Women	Androstenedione	–	3.2 mg/day	2.8 mg/day	2000 L/day	3.1–12.2 nmol/L	89–350 ng/dL
Women	Testosterone	–	190 μg/day	60 μg/day	500 L/day	0.7–2.8 nmol/L	20–81 ng/dL
Women	Estrone	Follicular phase	110 μg/day	80 μg/day	2200 L/day	110–400 pmol/L	30–110 pg/mL
Women	Estrone	Luteal phase	260 μg/day	150 μg/day	2200 L/day	310–660 pmol/L	80–180 pg/mL
Women	Estrone	Postmenopause	40 μg/day	Insignificant	1610 L/day	22–230 pmol/L	6–60 pg/mL
Women	Estradiol	Follicular phase	90 μg/day	80 μg/day	1200 L/day	<37–360 pmol/L	10–98 pg/mL
Women	Estradiol	Luteal phase	250 μg/day	240 μg/day	1200 L/day	699–1250 pmol/L	190–341 pg/mL
Women	Estradiol	Postmenopause	6 μg/day	Insignificant	910 L/day	<37–140 pmol/L	10–38 pg/mL
Women	Estrone sulfate	Follicular phase	100 μg/day	Insignificant	146 L/day	700–3600 pmol/L	250–1300 pg/mL
Women	Estrone sulfate	Luteal phase	180 μg/day	Insignificant	146 L/day	1100–7300 pmol/L	400–2600 pg/mL
Women	Progesterone	Follicular phase	2 mg/day	1.7 mg/day	2100 L/day	0.3–3 nmol/L	0.1–0.9 ng/mL
Women	Progesterone	Luteal phase	25 mg/day	24 mg/day	2100 L/day	19–45 nmol/L	6–14 ng/mL
Notes and sources Notes: "The concentration of a steroid in the circulation is determined by the rate at which it is secreted from glands, the rate of metabolism of precursor or prehormones into the steroid, and the rate at which it is extracted by tissues and metabolized. The secretion rate of a steroid refers to the total secretion of the compound from a gland per unit time. Secretion rates have been assessed by sampling the venous effluent from a gland over time and subtracting out the arterial and peripheral venous hormone concentration. The metabolic clearance rate of a steroid is defined as the volume of blood that has been completely cleared of the hormone per unit time. The production rate of a steroid hormone refers to entry into the blood of the compound from all possible sources, including secretion from glands and conversion of prohormones into the steroid of interest. At steady state, the amount of hormone entering the blood from all sources will be equal to the rate at which it is being cleared (metabolic clearance rate) multiplied by blood concentration (production rate = metabolic clearance rate × concentration). If there is little contribution of prohormone metabolism to the circulating pool of steroid, then the production rate will approximate the secretion rate." Sources: See template.

== Types ==
In many contexts, the two main classes of sex hormones are androgens and estrogens, of which the most important human derivatives are testosterone and estradiol, respectively. Other contexts will include progestogens as a third class of sex steroids, distinct from androgens and estrogens. Progesterone is the most important and only naturally occurring human progestogen. In general, androgens are considered "male sex hormones", since they have masculinizing effects, while estrogens and progestogens are considered "female sex hormones", since they have feminizing effects, although all types are present in each sex at different levels.

Sex hormones include:

- Progestogens
  - Pregnenolone → Progesterone → Allopregnanedione → Allopregnanolone
  - 17α-Hydroxypregnenolone → 17α-Hydroxyprogesterone
- Androgens
  - Dehydroepiandrosterone → Androstenedione → Androstanedione → Androsterone
  - Androstenediol → Testosterone → Dihydrotestosterone → Androstanediol
- Estrogens
  - 2-Hydroxyestrone ← Estrone → 16α-Hydroxyestrone
  - 2-Hydroxyestradiol ← Estradiol → Estriol → Estetrol

== Synthetic sex steroids ==
There are also many synthetic sex steroids. Synthetic androgens are often referred to as anabolic steroids. Synthetic estrogens and progestins are used in methods of hormonal contraception. Ethinylestradiol is an example of a semi-synthetic estrogen. Specific compounds that have partial agonist activity for steroid receptors may require treatment by a steroid in one cell type, and, therefore, act like natural steroid hormones. These compounds are used in certain medical conditions. Some systemic effects of a particular steroid in the entire organism are only desirable within certain limits.

== See also ==
- List of investigational sex-hormonal agents
- Effects of hormones on sexual motivation
- Sex hormone therapy
