= Horse breeding =

Human-selected breeding

Horse breeding is reproduction in horses, and particularly the human-directed process of selective breeding of animals, particularly purebred horses of a given breed. Planned matings can be used to produce specifically desired characteristics in domesticated horses. Furthermore, modern breeding management and technologies can increase the rate of conception, a healthy pregnancy, and successful foaling.

== Terminology ==
The male parent of a horse, a stallion, is commonly known as its sire and the female parent, the mare, is called its dam. A "foal" is a newly born or very young horse of either sex, a "colt" is a young male horse, and a "filly" is a young female. Though many horse owners might breed their mare to a local stallion in order to produce a companion animal, most professional breeders use selective breeding to produce horses of a given type or breed.

Usually a horse is considered "bred" where it is born, not where a mating takes place, though some breeds denote the country or state where conception took place as the origin of the foal. The "breeder", is the person who owned or leased the mare at the time of foaling. That individual may not have had anything to do with the mating of the mare.

The term "half-brother" or "half-sister" usually only describes horses which have the same dam, but different sires, while horses with the same sire but different dams are said to be "by the same sire", with no sibling relationship is implied. "Full" (or "own") siblings have both the same dam and the same sire. The terms paternal half-sibling, and maternal half-sibling are also often used. Three-quarter siblings are horses out of the same dam, and are by sires that are either half-brothers (i.e. same dam) or who are by the same sire.

Thoroughbreds and Arabians are also classified through the "distaff" or direct female line, known as their "family" or "tail-female" line, tracing back to their foundation bloodstock or the beginning of their respective stud books. The female line of descent always appears at the bottom of a tabulated pedigree and is therefore often known as the bottom line. In addition, the maternal grandfather of a horse has a special term: damsire.

"Linebreeding" technically is the duplication of fourth-generation or more distant ancestors. However, the term is often used more loosely, describing horses with duplication of ancestors closer than the fourth generation. It also is sometimes used as a euphemism for inbreeding, a practice that is generally frowned upon by horse breeders, though used by some in an attempt to change certain traits.

== Estrous cycle of the mare ==
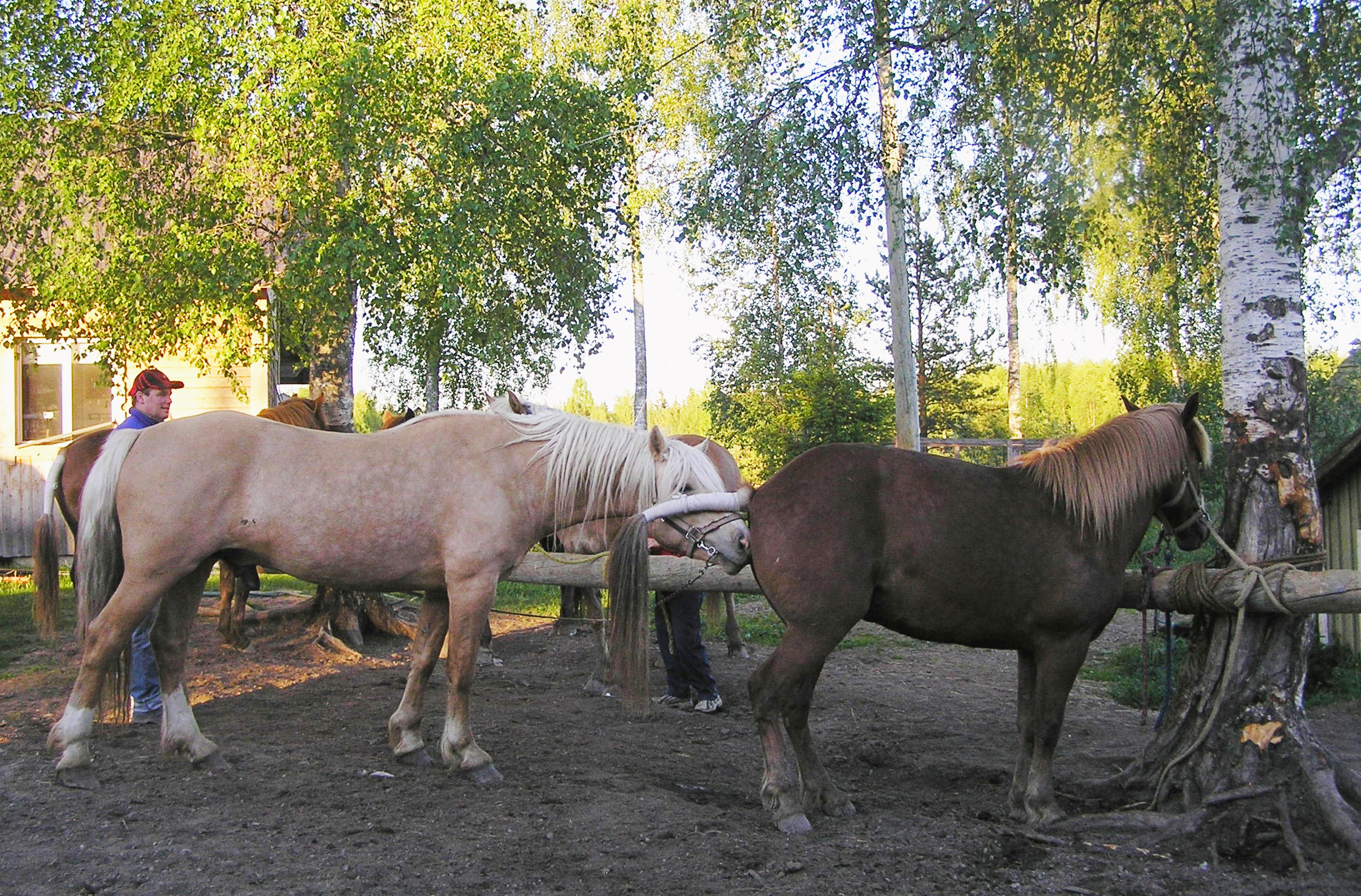
Stallion checking a mare in estrus. The mare welcomes the stallion by lowering her rear and lifting her tail.

=== Effects on the reproductive system during the estrous cycle ===
Changes in hormone levels can have great effects on the physical characteristics of the reproductive organs of the mare, thereby preparing, or preventing, her from conceiving.

- Uterus: increased levels of estrogen during estrus cause edema within the uterus, making it feel heavier, and the uterus loses its tone. This edema decreases following ovulation, and the muscular tone increases. High levels of progesterone do not cause edema within the uterus. The uterus becomes flaccid during anestrus.
- Cervix: the cervix starts to relax right before estrus occurs, with maximal relaxation around the time of ovulation. The secretions of the cervix increase. High progesterone levels (during diestrus) cause the cervix to close and become toned.
- Vagina: the portion of the vagina near the cervix becomes engorged with blood right before estrus. The vagina becomes relaxed and secretions increase.
- Vulva: relaxes right before estrus begins. Becomes dry, and closes more tightly, during diestrus.

=== Hormones involved in the estrous cycle, during foaling, and after birth ===
The cycle is controlled by several hormones which regulate the estrous cycle, the mare's behavior, and the reproductive system of the mare. The cycle begins when the increased day length causes the pineal gland to reduce the levels of melatonin, thereby allowing the hypothalamus to secrete GnRH.

- GnRH (Gonadotropin releasing hormone): secreted by the hypothalamus, causes the pituitary to release two gonadotrophins: LH and FSH.
- LH (Luteinizing hormone): levels are highest 2 days following ovulation, then slowly decrease over 4–5 days, dipping to their lowest levels 5–16 days after ovulation. Stimulates maturation of the follicle, which then in turn secretes estrogen. Unlike most mammals, the mare does not have an increase of LH right before ovulation.
- FSH (Follicle-stimulating hormone): secreted by the pituitary, causes the ovarian follicle to develop. Levels of FSH rise slightly at the end of estrus, but have their highest peak about 10 days before the next ovulation. FSH is inhibited by inhibin (see below), at the same time LH and estrogen levels rise, which prevents immature follicles from continuing their growth. Mares may however have multiple FSH waves during a single estrous cycle, and diestrus follicles resulting from a diestrus FSH wave are not uncommon, particularly in the height of the natural breeding season.
- Estrogen: secreted by the developing follicle, it causes the pituitary gland to secrete more LH (therefore, these 2 hormones are in a positive feedback loop). Additionally, it causes behavioral changes in the mare, making her more receptive toward the stallion, and causes physical changes in the cervix, uterus, and vagina to prepare the mare for conception (see above). Estrogen peaks 1–2 days before ovulation, and decreases within 2 days following ovulation.
- Inhibin: secreted by the developed follicle right before ovulation, "turns off" FSH, which is no longer needed now that the follicle is larger.
- Progesterone: prevents conception and decreases sexual receptibility of the mare to the stallion. Progesterone is therefore lowest during the estrus phase, and increases during diestrus. It decreases 12–15 days after ovulation, when the corpus luteum begins to decrease in size.
- Prostaglandin: secreted by the endrometrium 13–15 days following ovulation, causes luteolysis and prevents the corpus luteum from secreting progesterone
- eCG – equine chorionic gonadotropin – also called PMSG (pregnant mare serum gonadotropin): chorionic gonadotropins secreted if the mare conceives. First secreted by the endometrial cups around the 36th day of gestation, peaking around day 60, and decreasing after about 120 days of gestation. Also help to stimulate the growth of the fetal gonads.
- Prolactin: stimulates lactation
- Oxytocin: stimulates the uterus to contract

== Breeding and gestation ==
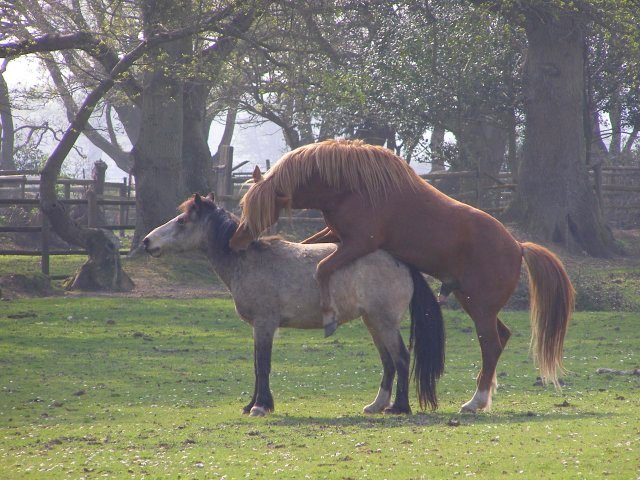
A stallion mating with a mare

Horses in the wild mate and foal in mid to late spring. For domestic horses bred for competitive purposes, especially horse racing, it is desirable that they be born as close as possible to January 1 in the northern hemisphere and August 1 in the southern hemisphere, so as to be at an advantage in size and maturity when competing against other horses in the same age group. When an early foal is desired, stud farm managers will put the mare "under lights" by keeping on the barn lights in the winter to simulate a longer day, thus bringing the mare into estrus sooner than she would in nature. Mares signal estrus and ovulation by urination in the presence of a stallion, raising the tail and revealing the vulva. A stallion, approaching with a high head, will usually nicker, nip and nudge the mare, as well as sniff her urine to determine her readiness for mating. During copulation, the stallion usually ejaculates after 6 to 8 pelvic thrusts.

Once fertilized, the oocyte (egg) remains in the oviduct for approximately 5.5 more days, and then descends into the uterus. The initial single cell combination is already dividing and by the time of entry into the uterus, the egg might have already reached the blastocyst stage.

The gestation period lasts for about eleven months, or about 340 days (normal average range 320–370 days). During the early days of pregnancy, the conceptus is mobile, moving about in the uterus until about day 16 when "fixation" occurs. Shortly after fixation, the embryo proper (so called up to about 35 days) will become visible on trans-rectal ultrasound (about day 21) and a heartbeat should be visible by about day 23. After the formation of the endometrial cups and early placentation is initiated (35–40 days of gestation) the terminology changes, and the embryo is referred to as a fetus. True implantation – invasion into the endometrium of any sort – does not occur until about day 35 of pregnancy with the formation of the endometrial cups, and true placentation (formation of the placenta) is not initiated until about day 40-45 and not completed until about 140 days of pregnancy. The fetus's sex can be determined by day 70 of the gestation using ultrasound. Halfway through gestation the fetus is the size of between a rabbit and a beagle. The most dramatic fetal development occurs in the last 3 months of pregnancy when 60% of fetal growth occurs.

Colts are carried on average about 4 days longer than fillies.

=== Care of the pregnant mare ===
Domestic mares receive specific care and nutrition to ensure that they and their foals are healthy. Mares are given vaccinations against diseases such as the Rhinopneumonitis (EHV-1) virus (which can cause miscarriage) as well as vaccines for other conditions that may occur in a given region of the world. Pre-foaling vaccines are recommended 4–6 weeks prior to foaling to maximize the immunoglobulin content of the colostrum in the first milk. Mares are dewormed a few weeks prior to foaling, as the mare is the primary source of parasites for the foal.

Mares can be used for riding or driving during most of their pregnancy. Exercise is healthy, though should be moderated when a mare is heavily in foal. Exercise in excessively high temperatures has been suggested as being detrimental to pregnancy maintenance during the embryonic period; however ambient temperatures encountered during the research were in the region of 100 degrees F and the same results may not be encountered in regions with lower ambient temperatures.

During the first several months of pregnancy, the nutritional requirements do not increase significantly since the rate of growth of the fetus is very slow. However, during this time, the mare may be provided supplemental vitamins and minerals, particularly if forage quality is questionable. During the last 3–4 months of gestation, rapid growth of the fetus increases the mare's nutritional requirements. Energy requirements during these last few months, and during the first few months of lactation are similar to those of a horse in full training. Trace minerals such as copper are extremely important, particularly during the tenth month of pregnancy, for proper skeletal formation. Many feeds designed for pregnant and lactating mares provide the careful balance required of increased protein, increased calories through extra fat as well as vitamins and minerals. Overfeeding the pregnant mare, particularly during early gestation, should be avoided, as excess weight may contribute to difficulties foaling or fetal/foal related problems.

== Foaling ==
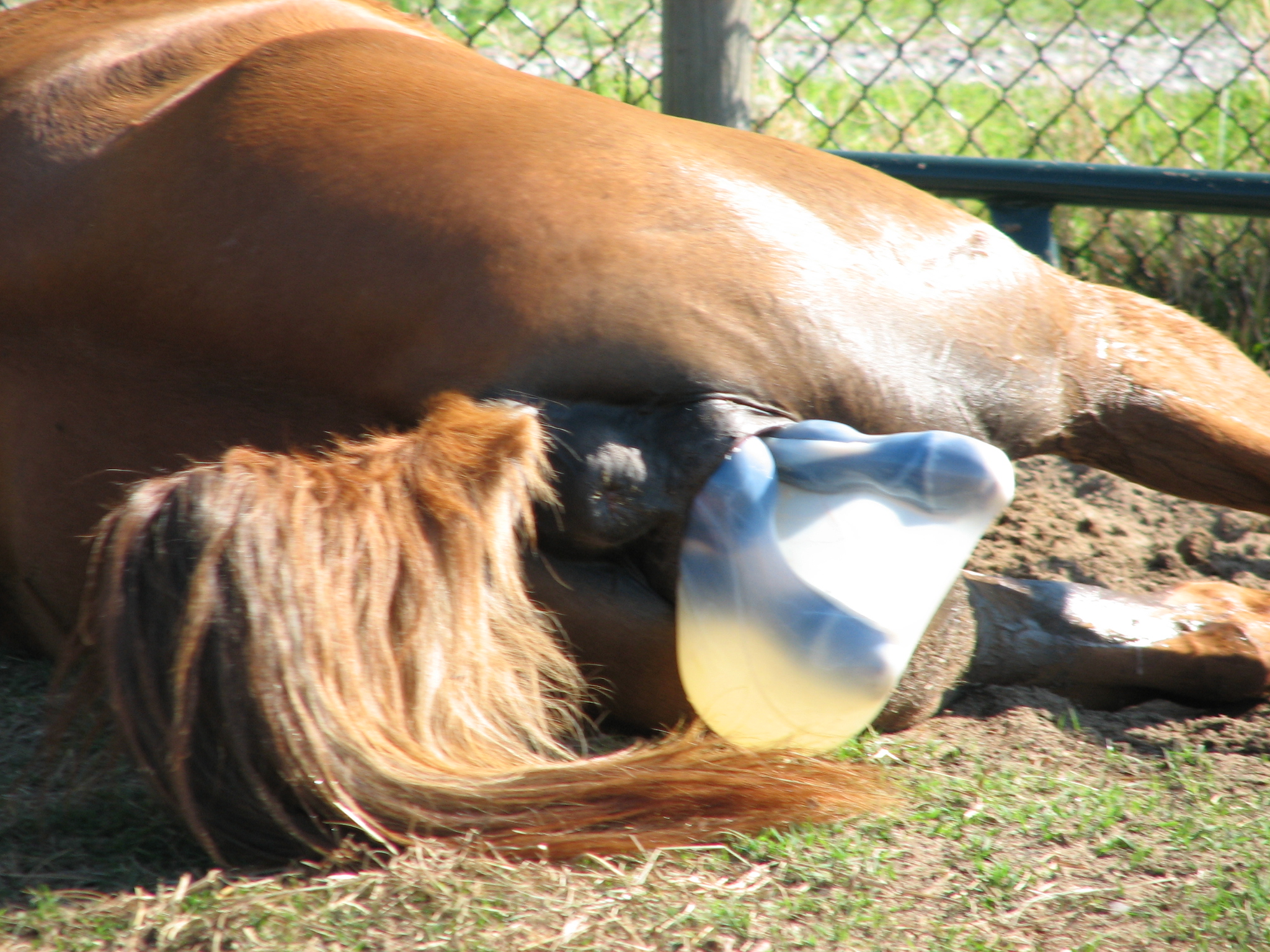
A mare in the early stages of labor

Mares due to foal are usually separated from other horses, both for the benefit of the mare and the safety of the soon-to-be-delivered foal. In addition, separation allows the mare to be monitored more closely by humans for any problems that may occur while giving birth. In the northern hemisphere, a special foaling stall that is large and clutter free is frequently used, particularly by major breeding farms. Originally, this was due in part to a need for protection from the harsh winter climate present when mares foal early in the year, but even in moderate climates, such as Florida, foaling stalls are still common because they allow closer monitoring of mares. Smaller breeders often use a small pen with a large shed for foaling, or they may remove a wall between two box stalls in a small barn to make a large stall. In the milder climates seen in much of the southern hemisphere, most mares foal outside, often in a paddock built specifically for foaling, especially on the larger stud farms. Many stud farms worldwide employ technology to alert human managers when the mare is about to foal, including webcams, closed-circuit television, or assorted types of devices that alert a handler via a remote alarm when a mare lies down in a position to foal.

On the other hand, some breeders, particularly those in remote areas or with extremely large numbers of horses, may allow mares to foal out in a field amongst a herd, but may also see higher rates of foal and mare mortality in doing so.

Most mares foal at night or early in the morning, and prefer to give birth alone when possible. Labor is rapid, often no more than 30 minutes, and from the time the feet of the foal appear to full delivery is often only about 15 to 20 minutes. Once the foal is born, the mare will lick the newborn foal to clean it and help blood circulation. In a very short time, the foal will attempt to stand and get milk from its mother. A foal should stand and nurse within one hour after birth.

To create a bond with her foal, the mare licks and nuzzles the foal, enabling her to distinguish the foal from others. Some mares are aggressive when protecting their foals, and may attack other horses or unfamiliar humans that come near their newborns.

After birth, a foal's navel is dipped in antiseptic to prevent infection. The foal is sometimes given an enema to help clear the meconium from its digestive tract. The newborn is monitored to ensure that it stands and nurses without difficulty. While most horse births happen without complications, many owners have first aid supplies prepared and a veterinarian on call in case of a birthing emergency. People who supervise foaling should also watch the mare to be sure that she passes the placenta in a timely fashion, and that it is complete with no fragments remaining in the uterus. Retained fetal membranes can cause a serious inflammatory condition (endometritis) and/or infection. If the placenta is not removed from the stall after it is passed, a mare will often eat it, an instinct from the wild, where blood would attract predators.

=== Foal care ===
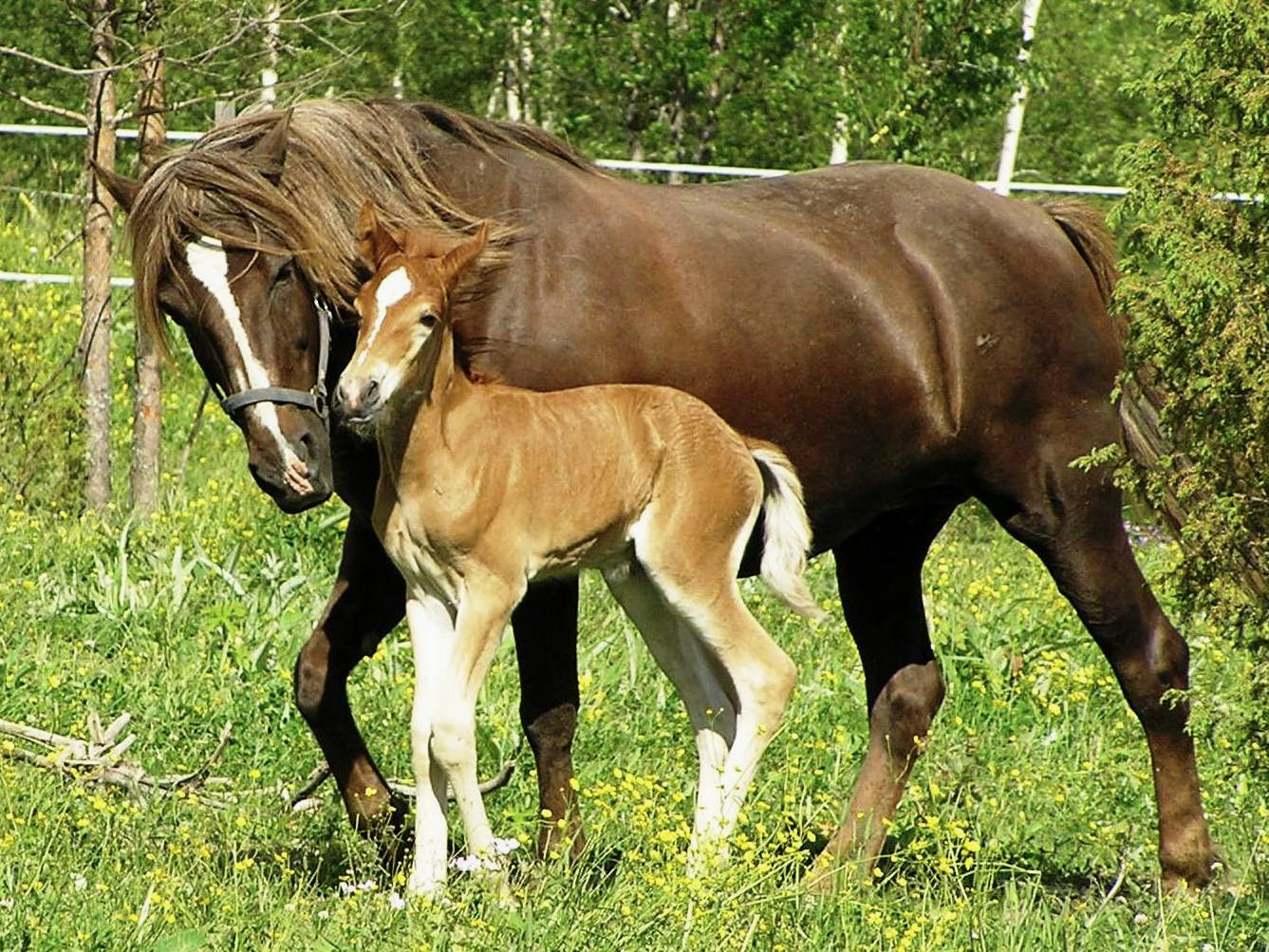
A foal with its mother, or dam

Foals develop rapidly, and within a few hours a wild foal can travel with the herd. In domestic breeding, the foal and dam are usually separated from the herd for a while, but within a few weeks are typically pastured with the other horses. A foal will begin to eat hay, grass and grain alongside the mare at about 4 weeks old; by 10–12 weeks the foal requires more nutrition than the mare's milk can supply. Foals are typically weaned at 4–8 months of age, although in the wild a foal may nurse for a year.

== How breeds develop ==
Beyond the appearance and conformation of a specific type of horse, breeders aspire to improve physical performance abilities. This concept, known as matching "form to function," has led to the development of not only different breeds, but also families or bloodlines within breeds that are specialists for excelling at specific tasks.

For example, the Arabian horse of the desert naturally developed speed and endurance to travel long distances and survive in a harsh environment, and domestication by humans added a trainable disposition to the animal's natural abilities. In the meantime, in northern Europe, the locally adapted heavy horse with a thick, warm coat was domesticated and put to work as a farm animal that could pull a plow or wagon. This animal was later adapted through selective breeding to create a strong but rideable animal suitable for the heavily armored knight in warfare.

Then, centuries later, when people in Europe wanted faster horses than could be produced from local horses through simple selective breeding, they imported Arabians and other oriental horses to breed as an outcross to the heavier, local animals. This led to the development of breeds such as the Thoroughbred, a horse taller than the Arabian and faster over the distances of a few miles required of a European race horse or light cavalry horse. Another cross between oriental and European horses produced the Andalusian, a horse developed in Spain that was powerfully built, but extremely nimble and capable of the quick bursts of speed over short distances necessary for certain types of combat as well as for tasks such as bullfighting.

Later, the people who settled America needed a hardy horse that was capable of working with cattle. Thus, Arabians and Thoroughbreds were crossed on Spanish horses, both domesticated animals descended from those brought over by the Conquistadors, and feral horses such as the Mustangs, descended from the Spanish horse, but adapted by natural selection to the ecology and climate of the west. These crosses ultimately produced new breeds such as the American Quarter Horse and the Criollo of Argentina. In Canada, the Canadian Horse descended from the French stock Louis XIV sent to Canada in the late 17th century.[6] The initial shipment, in 1665, consisted of two stallions and twenty mares from the Royal Stables in Normandy and Brittany, the centre of French horse breeding.[7] Only 12 of the 20 mares survived the trip. Two more shipments followed, one in 1667 of 14 horses (mostly mares, but with at least one stallion), and one in 1670 of 11 mares and a stallion. The shipments included a mix of draft horses and light horses, the latter of which included both pacing and trotting horses.[1] The exact origins of all the horses are unknown, although the shipments probably included Bretons, Normans, Arabians, Andalusians and Barbs.

In modern times, these breeds themselves have since been selectively bred to further specialize at certain tasks. One example of this is the American Quarter Horse. Once a general-purpose working ranch horse, different bloodlines now specialize in different events. For example, larger, heavier animals with a very steady attitude are bred to give competitors an advantage in events such as team roping, where a horse has to start and stop quickly, but also must calmly hold a full-grown steer at the end of a rope. On the other hand, for an event known as cutting, where the horse must separate a cow from a herd and prevent it from rejoining the group, the best horses are smaller, quick, alert, athletic and highly trainable. They must learn quickly, have conformation that allows quick stops and fast, low turns, and the best competitors have a certain amount of independent mental ability to anticipate and counter the movement of a cow, popularly known as "cow sense."

Another example is the Thoroughbred. While most representatives of this breed are bred for horse racing, there are also specialized bloodlines suitable as show hunters or show jumpers. The hunter must have a tall, smooth build that allows it to trot and canter smoothly and efficiently. Instead of speed, value is placed on appearance and upon giving the equestrian a comfortable ride, with natural jumping ability that shows bascule and good form.

A show jumper, however, is bred less for overall form and more for power over tall fences, along with speed, scope, and agility. This favors a horse with a good galloping stride, powerful hindquarters that can change speed or direction easily, plus a good shoulder angle and length of neck. A jumper has a more powerful build than either the hunter or the racehorse.

== History of horse breeding ==
The history of horse breeding goes back millennia. Though the precise date is in dispute, humans could have domesticated the horse as far back as approximately 4500 BCE. However, evidence of planned breeding has a more blurry history. It is well known, for example, that the Romans did breed horses and valued them in their armies, but little is known regarding their breeding and husbandry practices: all that remains are statues and artwork. Mankind has plenty of equestrian statues of Roman emperors, horses are mentioned in the Odyssey by Homer, and hieroglyphics and paintings left behind by Egyptians tell stories of pharaohs hunting elephants from chariots. Nearly nothing is known of what became of the horses they bred for hippodromes, for warfare, or even for farming.

One of the earliest people known to document the breedings of their horses were the Bedouin of the Middle East, the breeders of the Arabian horse. While it is difficult to determine how far back the Bedouin passed on pedigree information via an oral tradition, there were written pedigrees of Arabian horses by CE 1330. The Akhal-Teke of West-Central Asia is another breed with roots in ancient times that was also bred specifically for war and racing. The nomads of the Mongolian steppes bred horses for several thousand years as well, and the Caspian horse is believed to be a very close relative of Ottoman horses from the earliest origins of the Turks in Central Asia.

The types of horse bred varied with culture and with the times. The uses to which a horse was put also determined its qualities, including smooth amblers for riding, fast horses for carrying messengers, heavy horses for plowing and pulling heavy wagons, ponies for hauling cars of ore from mines, packhorses, carriage horses and many others.

Medieval Europe bred large horses specifically for war, called destriers. These horses were the ancestors of the great heavy horses of today, and their size was preferred not simply because of the weight of the armor, but also because a large horse provided more power for the knight's lance. Weighing almost twice as much as a normal riding horse, the destrier was a powerful weapon in battle meant to act like a giant battering ram that could quite literally run down men on an enemy line.

On the other hand, during this same time, lighter horses were bred in northern Africa and the Middle East, where a faster, more agile horse was preferred. The lighter horse suited the raids and battles of desert people, allowing them to outmaneuver rather than overpower the enemy. When Middle Eastern warriors and European knights collided in warfare, the heavy knights were frequently outmaneuvered. The Europeans, however, responded by crossing their native breeds with "oriental" type horses such as the Arabian, Barb, and Turkoman horse. This cross-breeding led both to a nimbler war horse, such as today's Andalusian horse, but also created a type of horse known as a Courser, a predecessor to the Thoroughbred, which was used as a message horse.

During the Renaissance, horses were bred not only for war, but for haute ecole riding, derived from the most athletic movements required of a war horse, and popular among the elite nobility of the time. Breeds such as the Lipizzan and the now extinct Neapolitan horse were developed from Spanish-bred horses for this purpose, and also became the preferred mounts of cavalry officers, who were derived mostly from the ranks of the nobility. It was during this time that firearms were developed, and so the light cavalry horse, a faster and quicker war horse, was bred for "shoot and run" tactics rather than the shock action as in the Middle Ages. Fine horses usually had a well muscled, curved neck, slender body, and sweeping mane, as the nobility liked to show off their wealth and breeding in paintings of the era.

After Charles II retook the British throne in 1660, horse racing, which had been banned by Cromwell, was revived. The Thoroughbred was developed 40 years later, bred to be the ultimate racehorse, through the lines of three foundation Arabian stallions and one Turkish horse.

In the 18th century, James Burnett, Lord Monboddo noted the importance of selecting appropriate parentage to achieve desired outcomes of successive generations. Monboddo worked more broadly in the abstract thought of species relationships and evolution of species. The Thoroughbred breeding hub in Lexington, Kentucky was developed in the late 18th century, and became a mainstay in American racehorse breeding.

The 17th and 18th centuries saw more of a need for fine carriage horses in Europe, bringing in the dawn of the warmblood. The warmblood breeds have been exceptionally good at adapting to changing times, and from their coach horse beginnings they easily transitioned during the 20th century into a sport horse type. Today's warmblood breeds are frequently used in competitive driving, but are more often seen competing in show jumping or dressage.

The Thoroughbred continues to dominate the horse racing world, although its lines have been more recently used to improve warmblood breeds and to develop sport horses. The French saddle horse is an excellent example as is the Irish Sport Horse, the latter being an unusual combination between a Thoroughbred and a draft breed.

The American Quarter Horse was developed early in the 18th century, mainly for quarter racing (racing ¼ of a mile). Colonists did not have racetracks or any of the trappings of Europe that the earliest Thoroughbreds had at their disposal, so instead the owners of Quarter Horses would run their horses on roads that lead through town as a form of local entertainment. As the USA expanded West, the breed went with settlers as a farm and ranch animal, and "cow sense" was particularly valued: their use for herding cattle increased on rough, dry terrain that often involved sitting in the saddle for long hours.

However, this did not mean that the original ¼-mile races that colonists held ever went out of fashion, so today there are three types: the stock horse type, the racer, and the more recently evolving sport type. The racing type most resembles the finer-boned ancestors of the first racing Quarter Horses, and the type is still used for ¼-mile races. The stock horse type, used in western events and as a farm and patrol animal is bred for a shorter stride, an ability to stop and turn quickly, and an unflappable attitude that remains calm and focused even in the face of an angry charging steer. The first two are still to this day bred to have a combination of explosive speed that exceeds the Thoroughbred on short distances clocked as high as 55 mph, but they still retain the gentle, calm, and kindly temperament of their ancestors that makes them easily handled.

The Canadian horse's origin corresponds to shipments of French horses, some of which came from Louis XIV's own stable. These were ill-suited to farm work and to the hardscrabble life of the New World, so like the Americans, early Canadians crossed their horses with natives escapees. In time they evolved along similar lines as the Quarter Horse to the South as both the US and Canada spread westward and needed a calm and tractable horse versatile enough to carry the farmer's son to school but still capable of running fast and running hard as a cavalry horse, a stockhorse, or a horse to pull a conestoga wagon.

Other horses from North America retained a hint of their mustang origins by being either derived from stock that Native Americans bred that came in a rainbow of color, like the Appaloosa and American Paint Horse, with those East of the Mississippi River increasingly bred to impress and mimic the trends of the upper classes of Europe: The Tennessee Walking Horse and Saddlebred were originally plantation horses bred for their gait and comfortable ride in the saddle as a plantation master would survey his vast lands like an English lord.

Horses were needed for heavy draft and carriage work until replaced by the automobile, truck, and tractor. After this time, draft and carriage horse numbers dropped significantly, though light riding horses remained popular for recreational pursuits. Draft horses today are used on a few small farms, but today are seen mainly for pulling and plowing competitions rather than farm work. Heavy harness horses are now used as an outcross with lighter breeds, such as the Thoroughbred, to produce the modern warmblood breeds popular in sport horse disciplines, particularly at the Olympic level.

== Choosing breeding stock ==
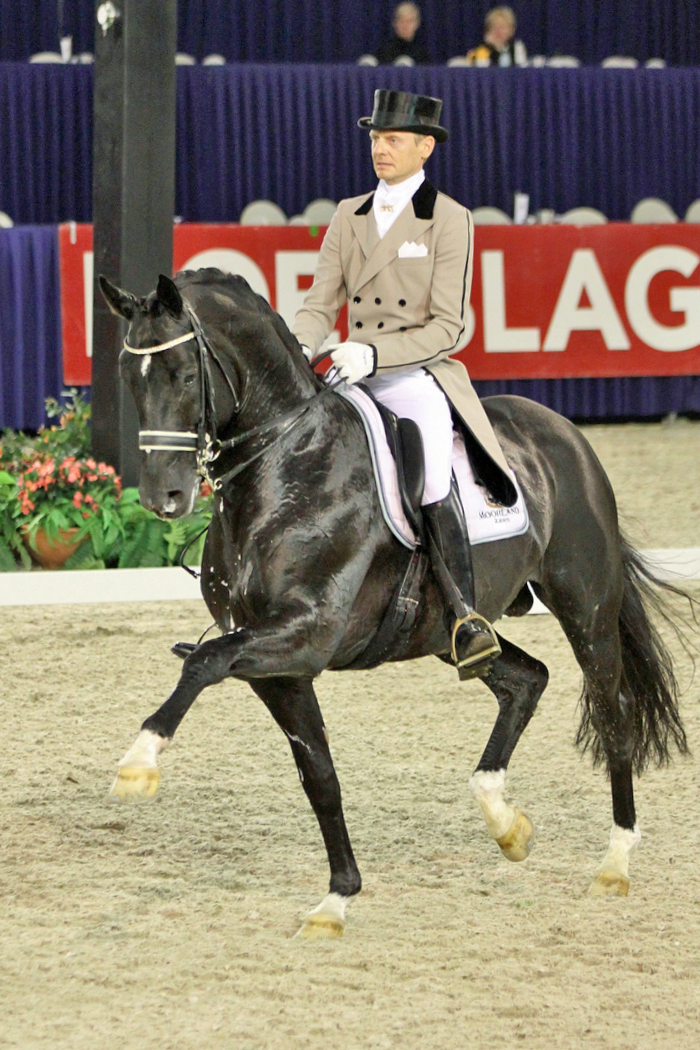
A stallion with a proven competition record may also be a suitable sire.

Some breeders consider the quality of the sire to be more important than the quality of the dam. However, other breeders maintain that the mare is the most important parent. Because stallions can produce far more offspring than mares, a single stallion can have a greater overall impact on a breed. Research from Nagoya University supports the belief that the most important factor affecting a thoroughbred's race performance is the quality of its sire, whereas the effect of the age of its broodmare is negligible. However, the mare may have a greater influence on an individual foal because its physical characteristics influence the developing foal in the womb and the foal also learns habits from its dam when young. Foals may also learn the "language of intimidation and submission" from their dam, and this imprinting may affect the foal's status and rank within the herd. Many times, a mature horse will achieve status in a herd similar to that of its dam; the offspring of dominant mares become dominant themselves. (See also Horse behavior.)

== Covering the mare ==
There are two general ways to "cover" or breed the mare:

- Live cover: the mare is brought to the stallion's residence and is covered "live" in the breeding shed. She may also be turned out in a pasture with the stallion for several days to breed naturally ('pasture bred'). The former situation is often preferred, as it provides a more controlled environment, allowing the breeder to ensure that the mare was covered, and places the handlers in a position to remove the horses from one another should one attempt to kick or bite the other. However, this causes more stress for the mare as she feels like she is being forced to undergo this procedure.
- Artificial Insemination (AI): the mare is inseminated by a veterinarian or an equine reproduction manager, using either fresh, cooled or frozen semen.

After the mare is bred or artificially inseminated, she is checked using ultrasound 14–16 days later to see if she "took", and is pregnant. A second check is usually performed at 28 days. If the mare is not pregnant, she may be bred again during her next cycle.

It is considered safe to breed a mare to a stallion of much larger size. Because of the mare's type of placenta and its attachment and blood supply, the foal will be limited in its growth within the uterus to the size of the mare's uterus, but will grow to its genetic potential after it is born. Test breedings have been done with draft horse stallions bred to small mares with no increase in the number of difficult births.

=== Live cover ===
When breeding live cover, the mare is usually boarded at the stud. She may be "teased" several times with a stallion that will not breed to her, usually with the stallion being presented to the mare over a barrier. Her reaction to the teaser, whether hostile or passive, is noted. A mare that is in heat will generally tolerate a teaser (although this is not always the case), and may present herself to him, holding her tail to the side. A veterinarian may also determine if the mare is ready to be bred, by ultrasound or palpating daily to determine if ovulation has occurred. Live cover can also be done in liberty on a paddock or on pasture, although due to safety and efficacy concerns, it is not common at professional breeding farms.

When it has been determined that the mare is ready, both the mare and intended stud will be cleaned. The mare will then be presented to the stallion, usually with one handler controlling the mare and one or more handlers in charge of the stallion. Multiple handlers are preferred, as the mare and stallion can be easily separated should there be any trouble.

The Jockey Club, the organization that oversees the Thoroughbred industry in the United States, requires all registered foals to be bred through live cover. Artificial insemination, listed below, is not permitted. Similar rules apply in other countries, such as Australia.

By contrast, the U.S. standardbred industry allows registered foals to be bred by live cover, or by artificial insemination (AI) with fresh or frozen (not dried) semen. No other artificial fertility treatment is allowed. In addition, foals bred via AI of frozen semen may only be registered if the stallion's sperm was collected during his lifetime, and used no later than the calendar year of his death or castration.

=== Artificial insemination ===
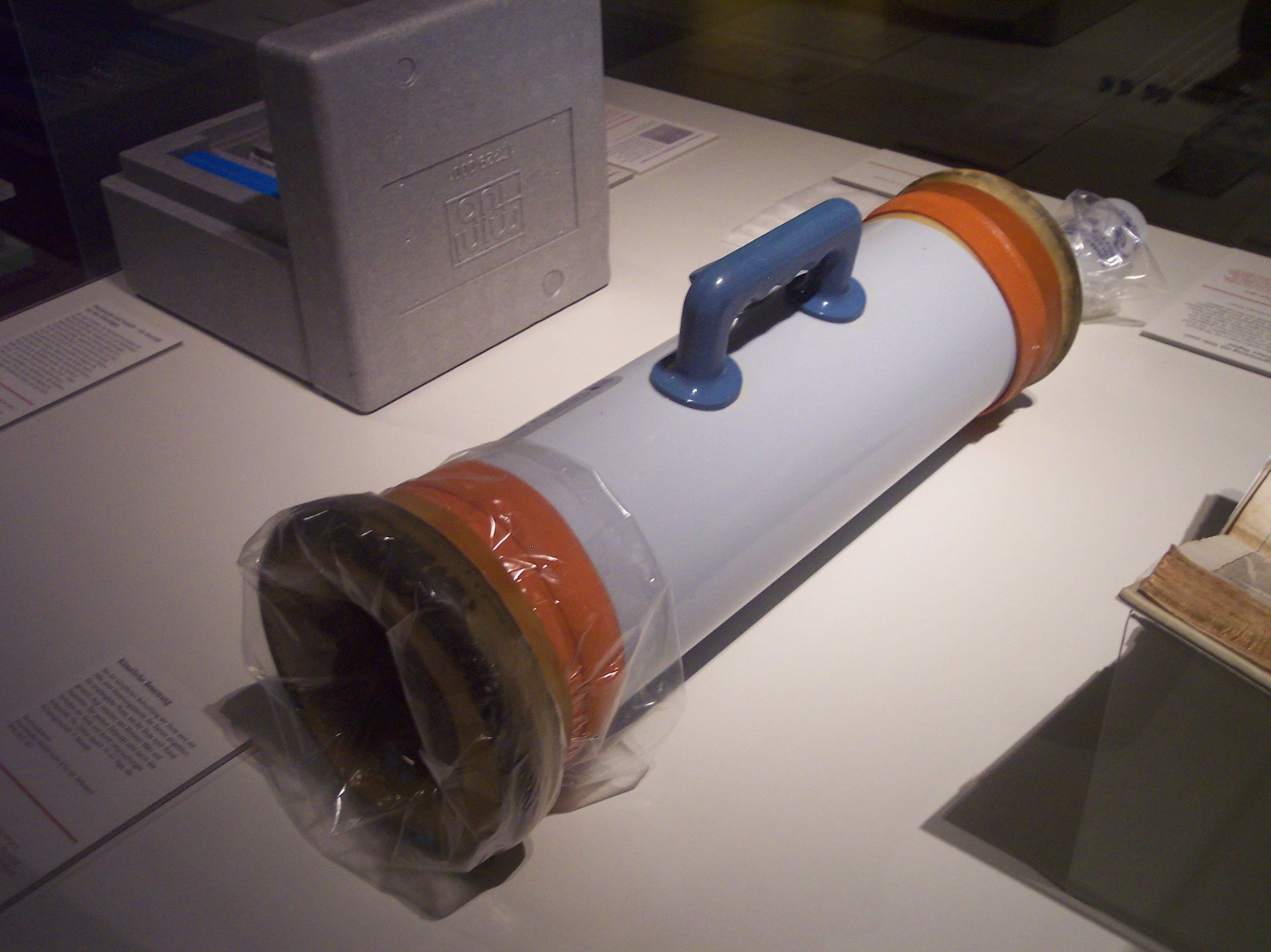
An artificial vagina used to collect semen

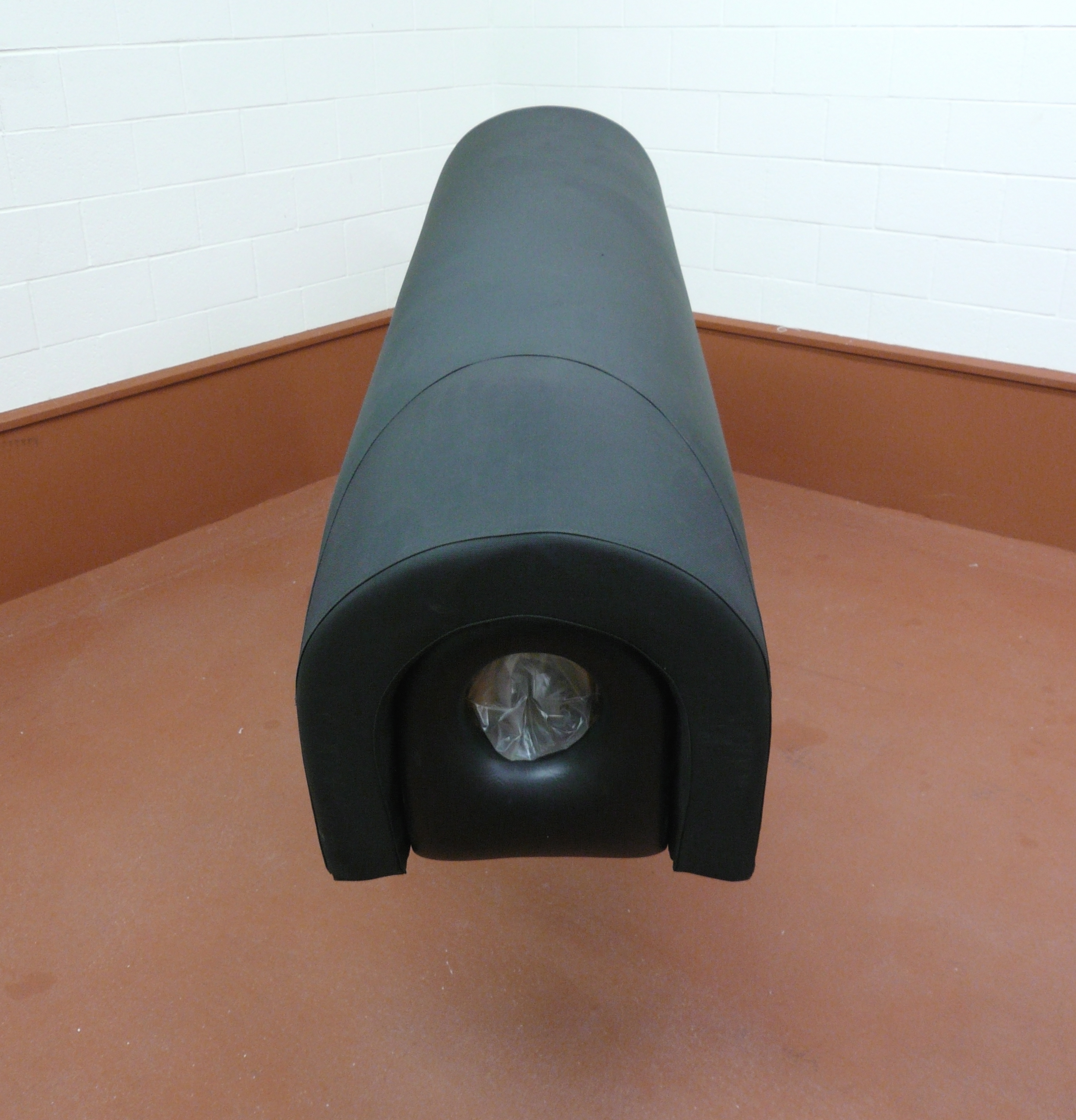
A breeding mount used to collect semen

Whereas the various national Thoroughbred associations typically require live cover, by 2009 most horse breeds allowed for the artificial insemination of mares with cooled, frozen or even fresh semen.

Artificial insemination (AI) has several advantages over live cover, and has a very similar conception rate:

- The mare and stallion never have to come in contact with each other, which therefore reduces breeding accidents, such as the mare kicking the stallion.
- AI opens up the world to international breeding, as semen may be shipped across continents to mares that would otherwise be unable to breed to a particular stallion.
- A mare also does not have to travel to the stallion, so the process is less stressful on her, and if she already has a foal, the foal does not have to travel.
- AI allows more mares to be bred from one stallion, as the ejaculate may be split between mares.
- AI reduces the chance of spreading sexually transmitted diseases between mare and stallion.
- AI allows mares or stallions with health issues, such as sore hocks which may prevent a stallion from mounting, to continue to breed.
- Frozen semen may be stored and used to breed mares even after the stallion is dead, allowing his lines to continue. However, the semen of some stallions does not freeze well. Some breed registries may not permit the registration of foals resulting from the use of frozen semen after the stallion's death, although other large registries accept such usage and provide registrations. The overall trend is toward permitting use of frozen semen after the death of the stallion.

A stallion is usually trained to mount a phantom (or dummy) mare, although a live mare may be used, and he is most commonly collected using an artificial vagina (AV) which is heated to simulate the vagina of the mare. The AV has a filter and collection area at one end to capture the semen, which can then be processed in a lab. The semen may be chilled or frozen and shipped to the mare owner or used to breed mares "on-farm". When the mare is in heat, the person inseminating introduces the semen directly into her uterus using a syringe and pipette.

=== Advanced reproductive techniques ===
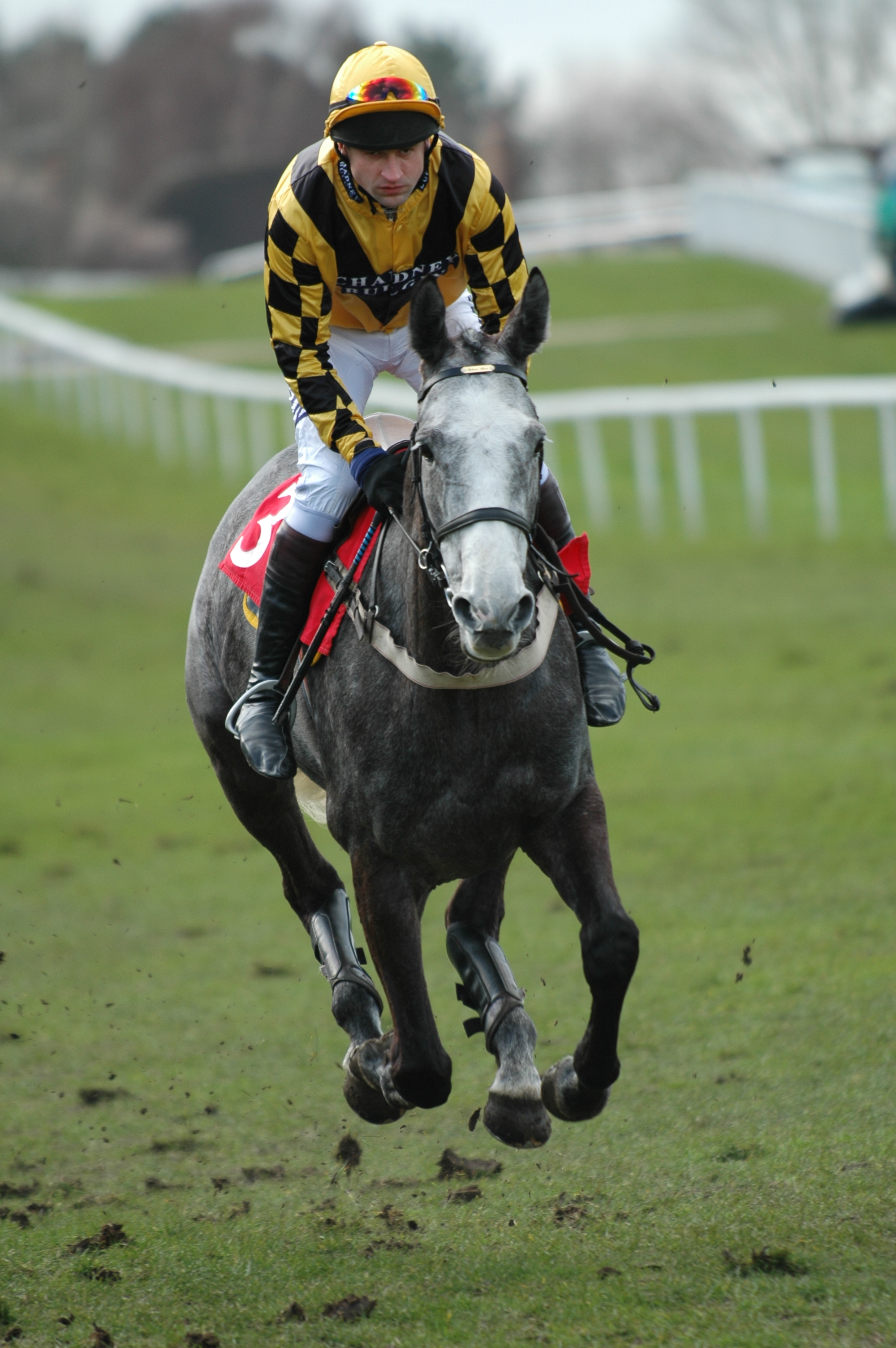
The Thoroughbred industry does not allow AI or embryo transplant.

Often an owner does not want to take a valuable competition mare out of training to carry a foal. This presents a problem, as the mare will usually be quite old by the time she is retired from her competitive career, at which time it is more difficult to impregnate her. Other times, a mare may have physical problems that prevent or discourage breeding. However, there are now several options for breeding these mares. These options also allow a mare to produce multiple foals each breeding season, instead of the usual one. Therefore, mares may have an even greater value for breeding.

- Embryo transfer: This relatively new method involves flushing out the mare's fertilized embryo a few days following insemination, and transferring to a surrogate mare, which has been synchronized to be in the same phase of the estrous cycle as the donor mare.
- Gamete intrafallopian transfer (GIFT): The mare's ovum and the stallion's sperm are deposited in the oviduct of a surrogate dam. This technique is very useful for subfertile stallions, as fewer sperm are needed, so a stallion with a low sperm count can still successfully breed.
- Egg transfer: An oocyte is removed from the mare's follicle and transferred into the oviduct of the recipient mare, who is then bred. This is best for mares with physical problems, such as an obstructed oviduct, that prevent breeding.
- Intracytoplasmic sperm injection (ICSI): Used in horses due to lack of successful co-incubation of female and male gametes in simple IVF. A plug of the zona pellucida is removed and a single sperm cell is injected into the ooplasm of the mature oocyte. An advantage of ICSI over IVF is that lower quality sperm can be used since the sperm does not have to penetrate the zona pellucida. The success rate of ICSI is 23-44% blastocyst development.

The world's first cloned horse, Prometea, was born in 2003. Other notable instances of horse cloning are:

- In 2006, Scamper, an extremely successful barrel racing horse, a gelding, was cloned. The resulting stallion, Clayton, became the first cloned horse to stand at stud in the U.S.
- In 2007, a renowned show jumper and Thoroughbred, Gem Twist, was cloned by Frank Chapot and his family. In September 2008, Gemini was born. Other clones followed, leading to the development of a breeding line from Gem Twist.
- In 2010, the first lived equine cloned of a Criollo horse was born in Argentina, and was the first horse clone produced in Latin America. In the same year a cloned polo horse was sold for $800,000 - the highest known price ever paid for a polo horse.
- In 2013, the world-famous polo star Adolfo Cambiaso helped his high-handicap team La Dolfina win the Argentine National Open, scoring nine goals in the 16-11 match. Two of those he scored atop a horse named Show Me, a clone, and the first to ride onto the Argentine pitch.

== See also ==
- Domestication of the horse
- Endometrosis
- Evolution of the horse
- Glossary of equestrian terms
- Pedigree chart
- Thoroughbred breeding theories
