= PMSG =

PMSG can stand for

- Pregnant mare's serum gonadotropin
- Permanent magnet synchronous generator, a kind of alternator.
