= EFSH =

Equine fertility-stimulating hormone

eFSH is a follicle-stimulating hormone obtained from equine species, used to stimulate fertility.

== Clinical studies ==
The effects of eFSH on mares is observed by creating a treatment group that received 12.5 milligrams of eFSA injections twice a day when the follicle of the mare was 25 mm in diameter then received human chorionic gonadotropin(hCG) at 35 mm follicle diameter while a control group only receives hCG at 35 mm follicle diameter.

=== Embryo transfer ===
The application of utilizing eFSH to increase the efficiency of equine embryo transfer was tested at the University of Saskatchewan. Embryos from 12 donor mares at 8 days of ovulation were recovered, scored, then transferred to 37 recipients mares who were tested for pregnancy after 7-10 days. 5 pregnancies resulted from the 15 embryos were recovered from the eFSA treatment group and 4 pregnancies occurred from the 6 embryos collected from the control. The usage of eFSA in the study had a correlation with a lower score.

=== Equine chorionic gonadotropin (eCG) production ===
The study conducted by the Department of Veterinary Sciences at the University of Kentucky has found that eFSH injections increase the probability superovulation occurring in mares and that carried twin result in a greater eCG concentration than one. Weekly blood samples were examined for eCG levels and the mares were compared gestation, twin pregnancy, and test grouping. 9 of the 10 mares in the eFSH group carried twin pregnancies and 1 of the 9 mares in the control groups carried twins. The mares carrying twins averaged around twice the eCG concentration of a regular pregnancy.

=== Effects of progesterone and estradiol ===
The aim of this experiment was to determine whether administration of progesterone and estradiol for 10 days eFSH would enhance the response to eFSH administration. The experiment was carried out with two groups. Group 1 was the control and group were injected with progesterone and estradiol. From this experiment it was concluded that there is no benefit to treating mare with progesterone and estradiol before eFSH treatment.
