= Gonadotropin surge-attenuating factor =

Gonadotropin surge-attenuating factor (GnSAF) is a nonsteroidal ovarian hormone produced by the granulosa cells of small antral ovarian follicles in females. GnSAF is involved in regulating the secretion of luteinizing hormone (LH) from the anterior pituitary and the ovarian cycle. During the early to mid-follicular phase of the ovarian cycle, GnSAF acts on the anterior pituitary to attenuate LH release, limiting the secretion of LH to only basal levels. At the transition between follicular and luteal phase, GnSAF bioactivity declines sufficiently to permit LH secretion above basal levels, resulting in the mid-cycle LH surge that initiates ovulation. In normally ovulating women, the LH surge only occurs when the oocyte is mature and ready for extrusion. GnSAF bioactivity is responsible for the synchronised, biphasic nature of LH secretion.

== Molecular structure and characteristics ==
GnSAF is a large molecule consisting of subunits that has the same structure as the carboxyl terminal fragment of human serum albumin (HAS). However, HSA, in its complete form, does not exhibit any GnSAF activity.

The smallest biologically active fraction of GnSAF found in human follicular fluid is a peptide of molecular mass 12.5 kDA. The activity of other subunits has not yet been clarified, but it has been confirmed that more than one protein contributes to the attenuating effect of GnSAF.

Since GnSAF is found in very low concentrations in the human follicular fluid, GnSAF in women has been difficult to isolate, sequence and conclusively characterise.

== Synthesis of GnSAF ==
GnSAF is produced in the granulosa cells of the small sized antral follicles, which have the highest concentration of GnSAF. Concentrations of GnSAF bioactivity is inversely proportional to follicle size. Upon synthesis, GnSAF is released into peripheral circulation.

Follicle-stimulating hormone (FSH) from the anterior pituitary stimulates and prolongs GnSAF biosynthesis in growing small antral follicles in the ovary. FSH induces expression and transcription of exons 12 and 13 of the HSA gene found in granulosa cells. During the early and mid-follicular phase, FSH is secreted to promote growth and proliferation of the granulosa cells, which increases GnSAF concentrations. Once the dominant ovarian follicle has been selected at mid-follicular phase, the non-dominant follicles undergo atresia. Without the presence of small follicles during the late follicular phase, GnSAF concentrations steadily decline to its lowest levels observable in the ovarian cycle. Additionally, the rate of GnSAF biosynthesis by the granulosa cells of the remaining dominant follicle decreases as the follicle approaches maturation. During the transition between luteal phase and follicular phase, GnSAF gradually increases from the late luteal phase and onwards due to the recruitment of follicles and concomitant rise of FSH.

The time-course production of GnSAF depends on the serum FSH concentrations. Higher serum concentrations of FSH increases the potency of the attenuating effects of GnSAF on release of LH. However, there is a limit to how much FSH can stimulate GnSAF production: FSH doses above 450 IU do not elicit any more increases in GnSAF bioactivity.

== Function ==
GnSAF antagonises the positive feedback effects of estradiol on GnRH-induced LH release during the follicular phase. GnSAF inhibits the stimulatory role of estradiol in increasing GnRH-induced de novo synthesis of GnRH receptors in the pituitary. GnRH receptor mRNA levels are low in the presence of high GnSAF bioactivity, which limits the availability of binding sites for GnRH at the pituitary and decreased pituitary sensitivity to GnRH. The moderated GnRH pulse amplitude and frequency is sufficient for maintaining low blood concentrations of LH and protects against premature LH surges and LH hypersecretion.

GnSAF also inhibits LH synthesis after the transcription stage and limits stored LH in the pituitary. Whilst the pulse amplitude of LH is reduced by GnSAF, constitutive production of LH is unaffected by GnSAF.

== Effects on the ovarian cycle in women ==
=== Follicular phase ===
GnSAF prevents a pre-ovulatory surge in LH during this time, allowing sufficient time for the dominant follicle to mature before ovulation.

At the start of the follicular phase, high serum FSH concentrations stimulate the development and proliferation of the granulosa cells of the small antral follicles, resulting in a steady increase in GnSAF biosynthesis. The relatively high GnSAF bioactivity dampens the response of the pituitary gland to GnRH by antagonising the sensitising effects of estradiol on the pituitary gland. The GnRH pulse, in the presence of GnSAF, is not frequent or potent enough to stimulate LH secretion from the anterior pituitary above basal levels.

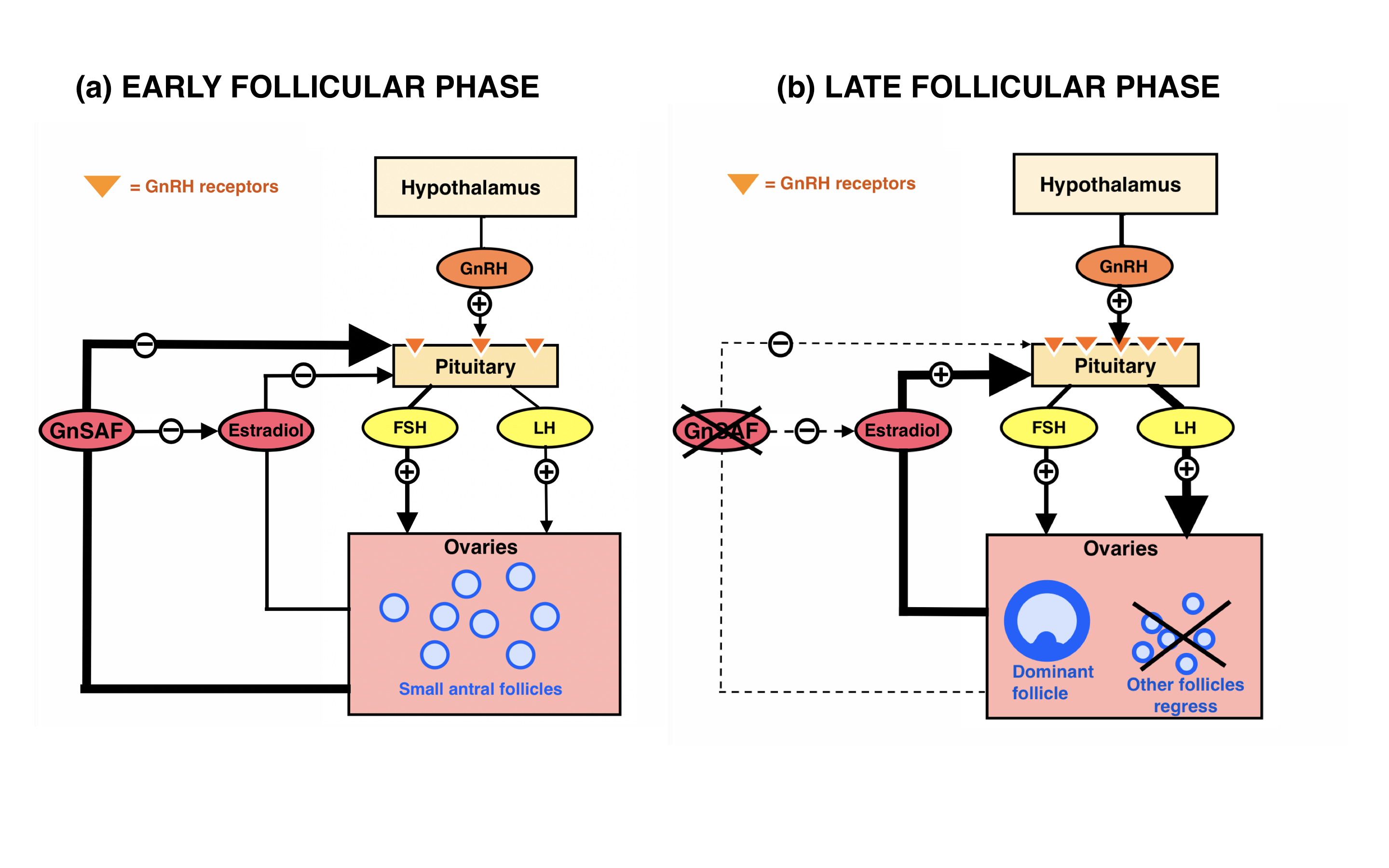
Diagram of the hormones released by the hypothalamic-pituitary-ovarian axis during the early and late follicular phase of the human ovarian cycle. Broken lines represent absence of action and size of the arrows indicates relative concentrations of the hormone.

The tonic FSH and LH pulses sufficiently stimulate the theca cells of the follicle to produce androgen substrates for granulosa cell aromatase and induces cytochrome P450 enzymes that can produce progesterone later in the luteal phase. Androgen substrates from the theca cells are used by the enlarging granulosa cells to produce more estradiol.

At mid-follicular phase, GnSAF bioactivity gradually declines as the dominant follicle is established and the small subordinate follicles undergo atresia. The development of the dominant follicle and regression of small non-dominant follicles is supported by increasing estradiol secretion.

Towards the end of the follicular phase, GnSAF bioactivity is at its lowest due to the absence of small antral follicles. Estradiol secretion from the dominant follicle exponentially increases and exceeds a threshold which switches estradiol feedback on GnRH pulse frequency from negative to positive. Pituitary sensitivity to GnRH is restored.

=== Mid-cycle ===
The absence of GnSAF lowers the threshold for GnRH pulse frequency and amplitude required to stimulate the anterior pituitary to secrete LH. Concurrently, GnRH pulse frequency and amplitude increases, which allows LH secretion significantly higher than basal levels. The LH secretion most noticeable as a LH surge lasting 48 to 72 hours in the middle of the ovarian cycle. Meiosis in the dominant follicle resumes and follicle ruptures shortly after the LH surge. Ovulation can only occur if GnSAF is absent and the mid-cycle LH surge occurs.

=== Luteal phase ===
Immediately after the LH surge and subsequent ovulation, estradiol concentrations drop and the corpus luteum develops.

Towards the end of luteal phase, GnSAF production in the small antral follicles increases steadily. FSH does not stimulate GnSAF production in the corpus luteum, so GnSAF bioactivity is low after ovulation, until the intercycle rise in FSH occurs.

== Relationship between GnRH and GnSAF ==
GnRH and GnSAF are functionally antagonistic over the control of LH secretion in the hypothalamic-pituitary axis. In the presence of GnSAF, endogenous pulses of GnRH from the hypothalamus still persist, in approximately one hour intervals. Due to this large time interval between consecutive GnRH pulses, GnSAF effectively limits the effects of GnRH on the anterior pituitary. GnSAF acts on the gonadotropic cells of the pituitary to neutralise the second messenger pathway responsible for transducing GnRH signalling in the gonadotropes. The effectiveness of downstream actions of GnRH, such as calcium mobilisation and the protein kinase C system, are reduced by GnSAF. These antagonistic effects of GnSAF on GnRH keeps the anterior pituitary in a low responsiveness state, which prevents acute elevations of serum LH concentrations until GnSAF bioactivity declines.

When estradiol concentrations are high in the late follicular phase, GnRH pulse frequency and amplitude increases and overrides the attenuating effects of GnSAF. Frequent and consecutive exogenous administration of GnRH at submaximal doses is sufficient in overcoming the neutralizing effects of GnSAF. This is because estradiol lowers the GnRH pulse frequency and amplitude required to stimulate the biosynthesis and secretion of LH.

== Associated disease states and abnormalities ==
Abnormal GnSAF bioactivity has been associated with premature surges in LH and LH hypersecretion. Optimal and timely changes in serum LH concentrations are crucial to ensuring the viability of oocytes and implantation after fertilization. For successful implantation of a zygote, the mid-cycle LH surge after the decline of GnSAF and ovulation must correspond with uterine receptivity. Hypersecretion of LH contributes to cycle disturbance, infertility and increased chances of miscarriage.

GnSAF has been implicated in polyendocrine metabolic ovarian syndrome (PMOS), one of the most common ovarian disorders responsible for causing anovulatory infertility. Approximately 40% of women with PMOS display higher GnRH pulse frequency and tonic hypersecretion of LH due to hypersecretion of androgens from the polycystic ovary. Androgens are readily metabolized to estradiol in the ovaries. The supraphysiological concentrations of estradiol maintains high pituitary responsiveness to GnRH, permitting the hypersecretion of LH.

Superovulation is common in women who take medications such as clomiphene citrate, an anti-estrogenic oral medication used to treat infertility. Superovulation is induced in women to increase chances of fertilization and conception in assisted reproductive techniques. In naturally superovulating women, the mid-cycle LH surge is significantly lower compared to that of normal ovulating women due to the presence of GnSAF in the late follicular phase fluid. The high basal GnSAF bioactivity is due to a greater number of small follicles, the site of GnSAF biosynthesis.

== Possible uses in medicine ==
An alternative to using GnRH analogues in IVF treatments could be short-term administration of GnSAF. During IVF, the ovaries are stimulated by raising estrogen concentrations to supraphysiological levels, which prevents the mid-cycle LH surge. Premature LH surges are unfavorable during IVF as it is associated with low oocyte viability and low success rates during IVF treatment. GnSAF could be used to influence ovarian hyperstimulation syndrome. Using GnSAF would potentially eliminate the need to use human chorionic gonadotropin.

Administration of GnSAF could also be used to prevent ovulation and replace exogenously administered steroids that are often perceived as being risky, or to delay the naturally premature LH surge observed in some hyperstimulated or infertile women. GnSAF could form part of a contraceptive drug or in treatments for infertility that target LH hypersecretion or abnormal ovarian cycles.
