= Follicle-stimulating hormone receptor =

Protein-coding gene in the species Homo sapiens

FSHR
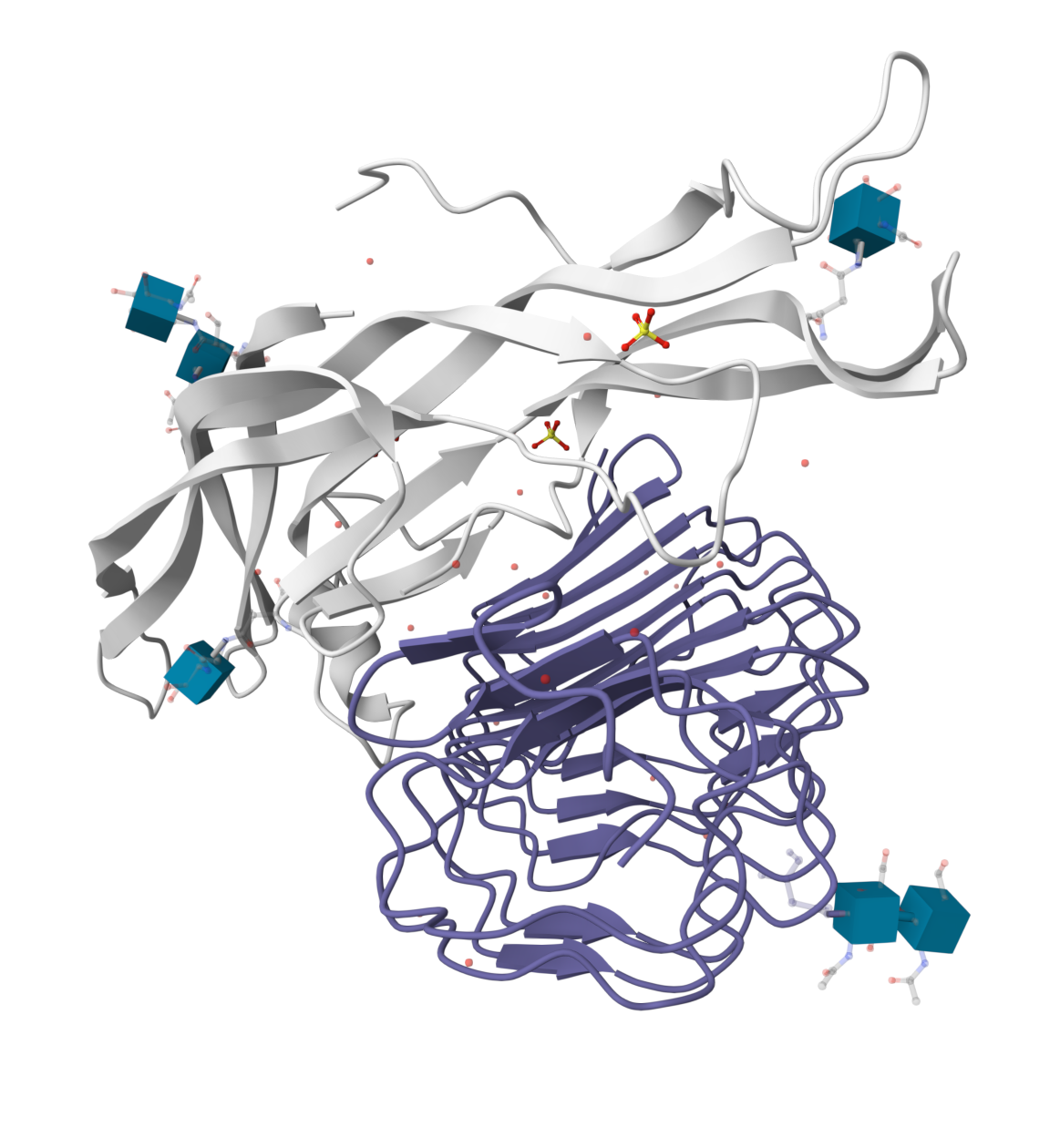

Identifiers
- Aliases: FSHR, FSHR1, FSHRO, LGR1, ODG1, follicle stimulating hormone receptor
- External IDs: OMIM: 136435; MGI: 95583; GeneCards: FSHR
Available structures
PDB	Ortholog search: PDBe RCSB
PDB	List of PDB id codes 1XWD, 4AY9, 4MQW

Gene location (Human)
Chr.	Chromosome 2 (human)
Band	2p16.3	Start	48,962,157 bp
Band	2p16.3	End	49,154,527 bp

Gene location (Mouse)
Chr.	Chromosome 17 (mouse)
Band	17|17 E5	Start	89,292,380 bp
Band	17|17 E5	End	89,508,103 bp
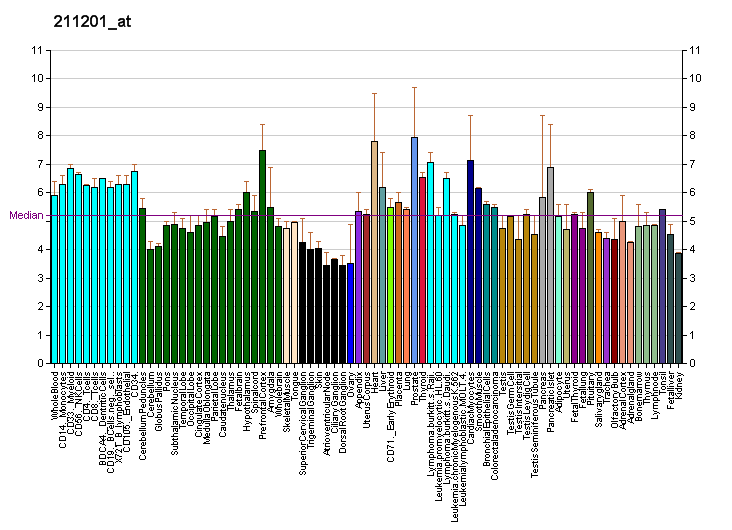
RNA expression pattern
Bgee	Human / Mouse (ortholog); Top expressed in: testicle; apex of heart; left ovary; left testis; right testis; muscle layer of sigmoid colon; right ovary; gallbladder; thymus; right coronary artery / Top expressed in: cumulus cell; Sertoli cell; perirhinal cortex; choroid plexus of fourth ventricle; entorhinal cortex; extraocular muscle; spermatocyte; zygote; oocyte; primary oocyte; More reference expression data
BioGPS	More reference expression data
Gene ontology
Molecular function	G protein-coupled peptide receptor activity; G protein-coupled receptor activity; signal transducer activity; protein-hormone receptor activity; protein binding; follicle-stimulating hormone receptor activity
Cellular component	integral component of membrane; membrane; integral component of plasma membrane; plasma membrane; intracellular anatomical structure; receptor complex
Biological process	G protein-coupled receptor signaling pathway; male gonad development; adenylate cyclase-activating G protein-coupled receptor signaling pathway; female gamete generation; primary ovarian follicle growth; regulation of protein kinase A signaling; female gonad development; activation of adenylate cyclase activity; regulation of osteoclast differentiation; spermatogenesis; hormone-mediated signaling pathway; positive regulation of ERK1 and ERK2 cascade; positive regulation of phosphatidylinositol 3-kinase signaling; gonad development; signal transduction; positive regulation of adenylate cyclase activity; cellular response to follicle-stimulating hormone stimulus; follicle-stimulating hormone signaling pathway
Sources:Amigo / QuickGO
Orthologs
Databases	NCBI: entry; OMA: entry
Species	Human	Mouse
Entrez	2492	14309
Ensembl	ENSG00000170820	ENSMUSG00000032937
UniProt	P23945	P35378
RefSeq (mRNA)	NM_000145; NM_181446	NM_013523
RefSeq (protein)	NP_000136; NP_852111	NP_038551
Location (UCSC)	Chr 2: 48.96 – 49.15 Mb	Chr 17: 89.29 – 89.51 Mb
PubMed search
- Wikidata
View/Edit Human	View/Edit Mouse

The follicle-stimulating hormone receptor or FSH receptor (FSHR) is a transmembrane receptor that interacts with the follicle-stimulating hormone (FSH) and represents a G protein-coupled receptor (GPCR). Its activation is necessary for the hormonal functioning of FSH. FSHRs are found in the ovary, testis, and uterus.

== FSHR gene ==
The gene for the FSHR is found on chromosome 2 p21 in humans. The gene sequence of the FSHR consists of about 2,080 nucleotides.

== Receptor structure ==
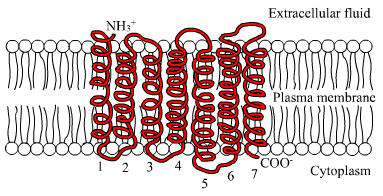
The seven transmembrane α-helix structure of a G protein-coupled receptor such as FSHR

The FSHR consists of 695 amino acids and has a molecular mass of about 76 kDa. Like other GPCRs, the FSH-receptor possesses seven membrane-spanning domains or transmembrane helices.

- The extracellular domain of the receptor contains 11 leucine-rich repeats and is glycosylated. It has two subdomains, a hormone-binding subdomain followed by a signal-specificity subdomain. The hormone-binding subdomain is responsible for the high-affinity hormone binding, and the signal-specificity subdomain, containing a sulfated tyrosine at position 335 (sTyr) in a hinge loop, is required for the hormone activity.
- The transmembrane domain contains two highly conserved cysteine residues that build disulfide bonds to stabilize the receptor structure. A highly conserved Asp-Arg-Tyr triplet motif is present in GPCR family members in general and may be of importance to transmit the signal. In FSHR and its closely related other glycoprotein hormone receptor members (LHR and TSHR), this conserved triplet motif is a variation Glu-Arg-Trp sequence.
- The C-terminal domain is intracellular and brief, rich in serine and threonine residues for possible phosphorylation.

== Ligand binding and signal transduction ==
Upon initial binding to the LRR region of FSHR, FSH reshapes its conformation to form a new pocket. FSHR then inserts its sulfotyrosine from the hinge loop into the pockets and activates the 7-helical transmembrane domain. This event leads to a transduction of the signal that activates the Gs protein that is bound to the receptor internally. With FSH attached, the receptor shifts conformation and, thus, mechanically activates the G protein, which detaches from the receptor and activates the cAMP system.

It is believed that a receptor molecule exists in a conformational equilibrium between active and inactive states. The binding of FSH to the receptor shifts the equilibrium between active and inactive receptors. FSH and FSH-agonists shift the equilibrium in favor of active states; FSH antagonists shift the equilibrium in favor of inactive states.

=== Phosphorylation by cAMP-dependent protein kinases ===
Cyclic AMP-dependent protein kinases (protein kinase A) are activated by the signal chain coming from the Gs protein (that was activated by the FSH-receptor) via adenylate cyclase and cyclic AMP (cAMP).

These protein kinases are present as tetramers with two regulatory units and two catalytic units. Upon binding of cAMP to the regulatory units, the catalytic units are released and initiate the phosphorylation of proteins, leading to the physiologic action. The cyclic AMP-regulatory dimers are degraded by phosphodiesterase and release 5'AMP. DNA in the cell nucleus binds to phosphorylated proteins through the cyclic AMP response element (CRE), which results in the activation of genes.

The signal is amplified by the involvement of cAMP and the resulting phosphorylation. The process is modified by prostaglandins. Other cellular regulators are participate are the intracellular calcium concentration modified by phospholipase, nitric acid, and other growth factors.

The FSH receptor can also activate the extracellular signal-regulated kinases (ERK). In a feedback mechanism, these activated kinases phosphorylate the receptor.

== Action ==
In the ovary, the FSH receptor is necessary for follicular development and expressed on the granulosa cells.

In the male, the FSH receptor has been identified on the Sertoli cells that are critical for spermatogenesis.

The FSHR is expressed during the luteal phase in the secretory endometrium of the uterus.

FSH receptor is selectively expressed on the surface of the blood vessels of a wide range of carcinogenic tumors.

== Receptor regulation ==
=== Upregulation ===
Upregulation refers to the increase in the number of receptor sites on the membrane. Estrogen upregulates FSH receptor sites. In turn, FSH stimulates granulosa cells to produce estrogens. This synergistic activity of estrogen and FSH allows for follicle growth and development in the ovary.

=== Desensitization ===
The FSHR become desensitized when exposed to FSH for some time. A key reaction of this downregulation is the phosphorylation of the intracellular (or cytoplasmic) receptor domain by protein kinases. This process uncouples Gs protein from the FSHR. Another way to desensitize is to uncouple the regulatory and catalytic units of the cAMP system.

=== Downregulation ===
Downregulation refers to the decrease in the number of receptor sites. This can be accomplished by metabolizing bound FSHR sites. The bound FSH-receptor complex is brought by lateral migration to a "coated pit," where such units are concentrated and then stabilized by a framework of clathrins. A pinched-off coated pit is internalized and degraded by lysosomes. Proteins may be metabolized or the receptor can be recycled.

=== Modulators ===
Antibodies to FSHR can interfere with FSHR activity.

== FSH abnormalities ==
Some patients with ovarian hyperstimulation syndrome may have mutations in the gene for FSHR, making them more sensitive to gonadotropin stimulation.

Women with 46 XX gonadal dysgenesis experience primary amenorrhea with hypergonadotropic hypogonadism. There are forms of 46 xx gonadal dysgenesis wherein abnormalities in the FSH-receptor have been reported and are thought to be the cause of the hypogonadism.

Polymorphism may affect FSH receptor populations and lead to poorer responses in infertile women receiving FSH medication for IVF.

Alternative splicing of the FSHR gene may be implicated in subfertility in males

== Ligands ==
Follicle-stimulating hormone (FSH) is an agonist of the FSHR.

Small-molecule positive allosteric modulators of the FSHR have been developed.

== History ==
Alfred G. Gilman and Martin Rodbell received the 1994 Nobel Prize in Medicine and Physiology for "their discovery of G-proteins and the role of these proteins in signal transduction in cells".

== See also ==
- Luteinizing hormone/choriogonadotropin receptor
