= FSHB =

Protein-coding gene in the species Homo sapiens

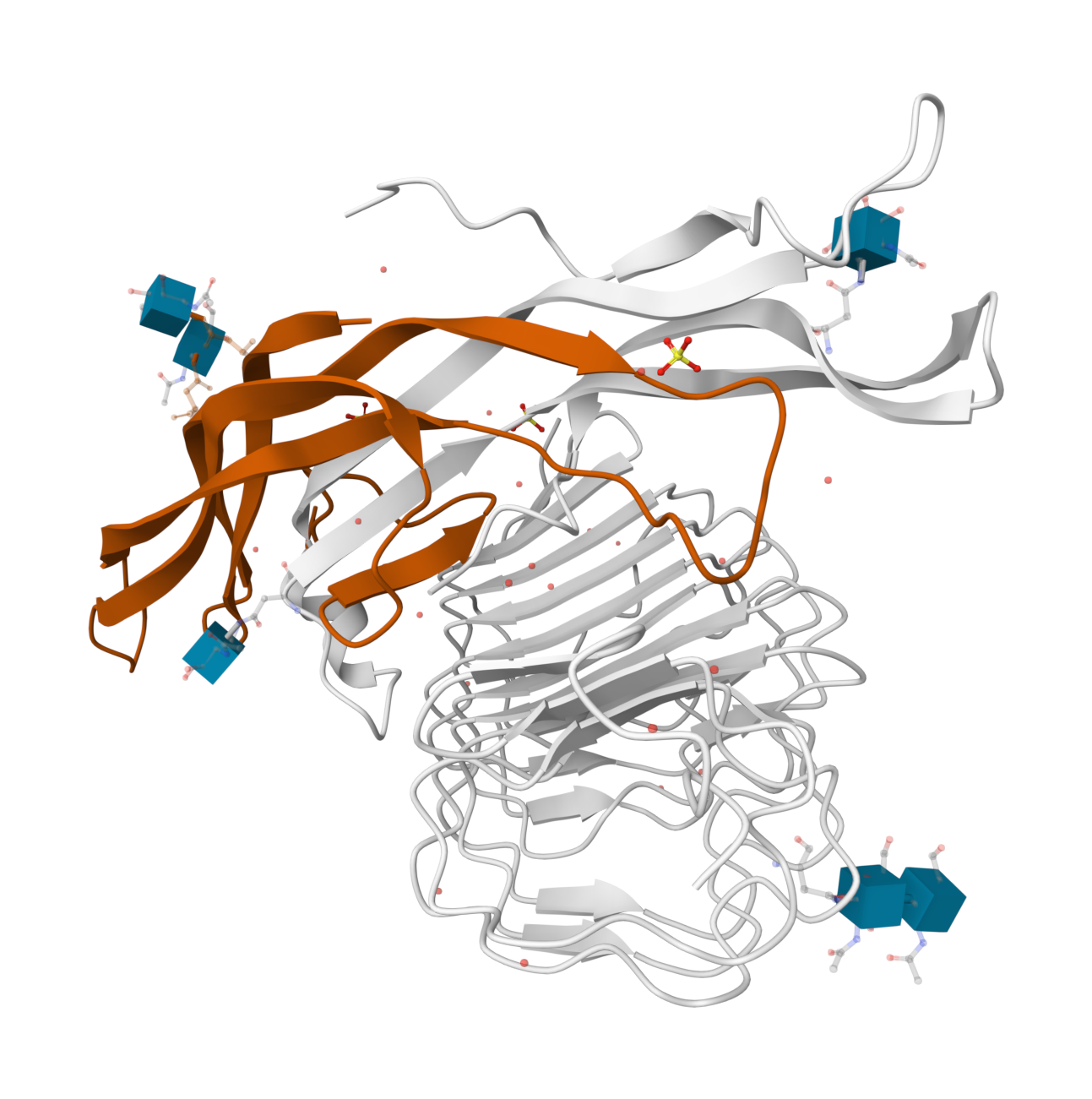

Identifiers
- Aliases: FSHB, HH24, follicle stimulating hormone beta subunit, Follitropin subunit beta, follicle stimulating hormone subunit beta
- External IDs: OMIM: 136530; MGI: 95582; GeneCards: FSHB
Available structures
PDB	Ortholog search: PDBe RCSB
PDB	List of PDB id codes 1FL7, 1XWD, 4AY9, 4MQW

Gene location (Human)
Chr.	Chromosome 11 (human)
Band	11p14.1	Start	30,231,014 bp
Band	11p14.1	End	30,235,261 bp

Gene location (Mouse)
Chr.	Chromosome 2 (mouse)
Band	2 E3|2 56.02 cM	Start	106,886,485 bp
Band	2 E3|2 56.02 cM	End	106,890,001 bp
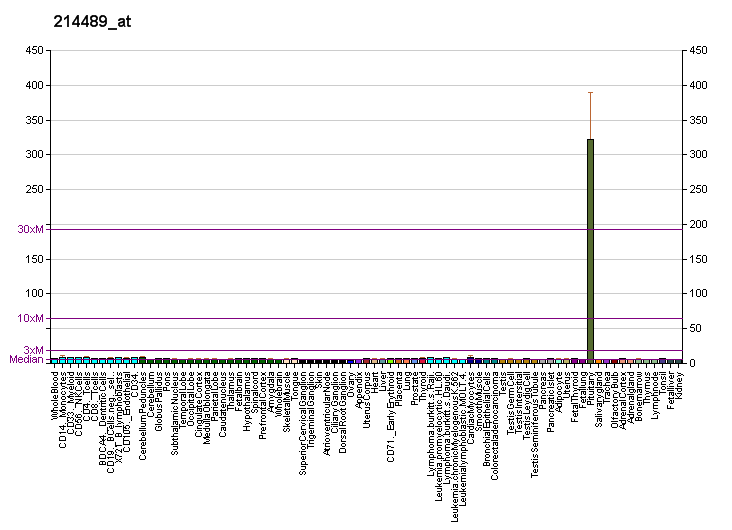
RNA expression pattern
Bgee	Human / Mouse (ortholog); Top expressed in: anterior pituitary; testicle; amygdala; mammary gland; breast; lactiferous gland; right lung; connective tissue; adipose tissue; ventricle of the heart / Top expressed in: pituitary gland; anterior pituitary; pars distalis of adenohypophysis; secondary oocyte; median eminence; nucleus of stria terminalis; vasculature of organ; hypothalamus; hippocampal formation; hippocampus proper; More reference expression data
BioGPS	More reference expression data
Gene ontology
Molecular function	follicle-stimulating hormone activity; protein binding; hormone activity
Cellular component	cytoplasm; extracellular region; extracellular space; follicle-stimulating hormone complex
Biological process	progesterone biosynthetic process; female gamete generation; positive regulation of bone resorption; regulation of osteoclast differentiation; transforming growth factor beta receptor signaling pathway; positive regulation of cell migration; positive regulation of transcription by RNA polymerase II; female pregnancy; positive regulation of cell population proliferation; ovarian follicle development; Sertoli cell proliferation; signal transduction; peptide hormone processing; positive regulation of gene expression; cell-cell signaling; hormone-mediated signaling pathway; follicle-stimulating hormone signaling pathway; regulation of signaling receptor activity; G protein-coupled receptor signaling pathway; positive regulation of steroid biosynthetic process
Sources:Amigo / QuickGO
Orthologs
Databases	NCBI: entry; OMA: entry
Species	Human	Mouse
Entrez	2488	14308
Ensembl	ENSG00000131808	ENSMUSG00000027120
UniProt	P01225	Q60687
RefSeq (mRNA)	NM_000510; NM_001018080; NM_001382289	NM_008045
RefSeq (protein)	NP_000501; NP_001018090; NP_001369218	NP_032071
Location (UCSC)	Chr 11: 30.23 – 30.24 Mb	Chr 2: 106.89 – 106.89 Mb
PubMed search
- Wikidata
View/Edit Human	View/Edit Mouse

Follitropin subunit beta also known as follicle-stimulating hormone beta subunit (FSH-B) is a protein that in humans is encoded by the FSHB gene. Alternative splicing results in two transcript variants encoding the same protein.

== Function ==
The pituitary glycoprotein hormone family includes follicle-stimulating hormone, luteinizing hormone, chorionic gonadotropin, and thyroid-stimulating hormone. All of these glycoproteins consist of an identical alpha subunit and a hormone-specific beta subunit. This gene encodes the beta subunit of follicle-stimulating hormone. In conjunction with luteinizing hormone, follicle-stimulating hormone induces egg and sperm production.

The FSHB gene in human DNA encodes the follicle-stimulating hormone subunit beta protein (FSH-B), or Follitropin Beta. More specifically, the FSHB gene encodes for the beta subunit of follicle-stimulating hormone (FSH). Therefore, proper transcription of FSHB allows for the proper production of FSH. FSH is a peptide hormone the pituitary gland produces that is involved with the reproductive system. FSH promotes follicular oocyte (egg) production, growth, and maturation and helps control a female's menstrual cycle. Additionally, FSH is involved in the male reproductive system by stimulating spermatogenesis (maturation of sperm cells) and initiating puberty. Studies show that variations in the FSHB gene can contribute to the likelihood of a woman becoming pregnant with fraternal, or dizygotic, twins. This is because certain heritable variations of FSHB contribute to increased production of FSH from the pituitary gland, raising the levels of FSH found in a woman's blood. It is also shown that women with these FSHB variants had their first menstrual cycle, children, and menopause at an earlier age than women without the variant. This relates to having an increased risk of a woman bearing fraternal twins because higher levels of FSH will produce more eggs. The more eggs a woman produces increases the chance of multiple eggs ovulating and becoming fertilized by sperm. In retrospect, depending on the type of variation, the FSHB gene could potentially cause infertility by the inability to produce enough FSH, in both males and females. Additionally, low or no FSH can result in delayed puberty and risk of disease. Diseases associated with FSHB variants are hypogonadism, hypogonadotropic hypogonadism type 24 (HH24), and type 7 (HH7), and are possibly linked to polycystic ovary syndrome.
