= Florence Comite =

American endocrinologist

Florence Comite, MD
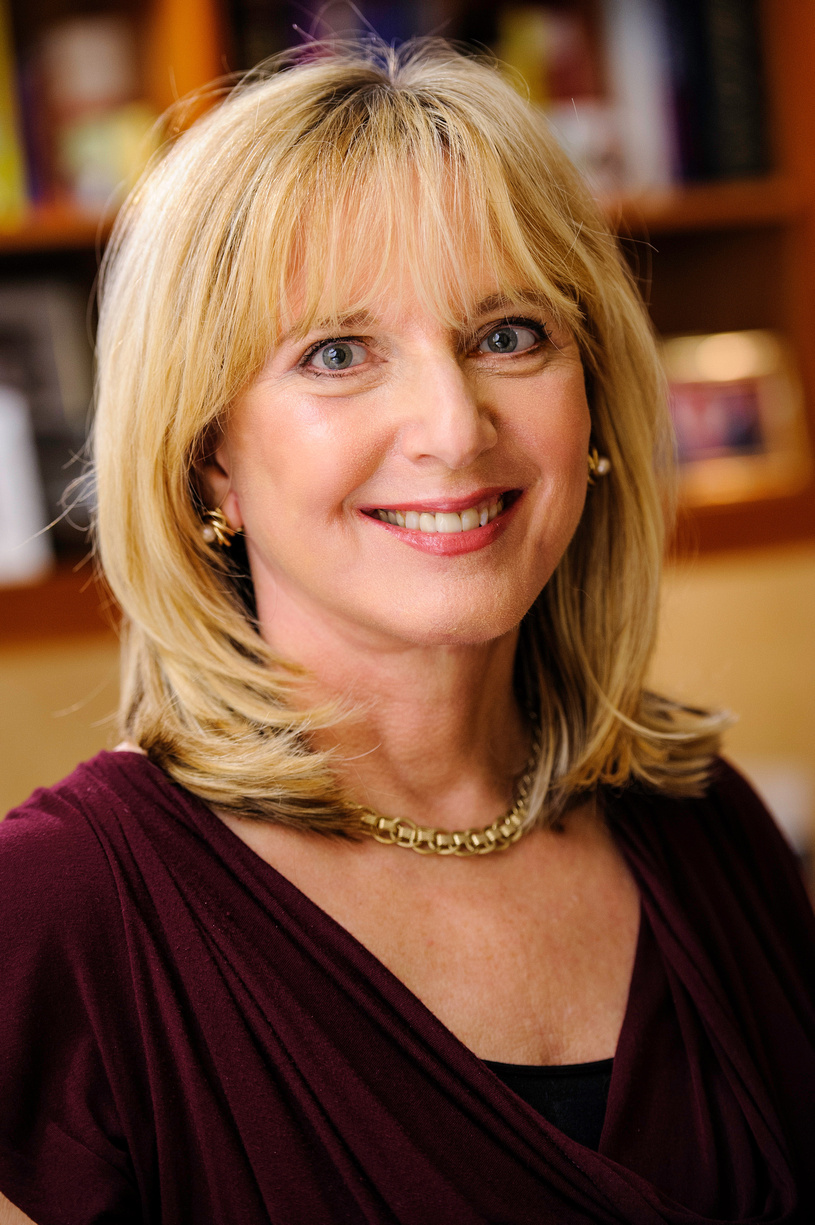
- Comite in 2014
- Born: Florence Comite
- Occupations: Physician, endocrinologist
- Employer(s): Comite Center for Precision Medicine & Healthy Longevity, Northwell Health
- Known for: Associate Clinical Professor Yale University School of Medicine
- Website: Official website

Florence Comite is an American endocrinologist who has helped develop new therapies for osteoporosis, endometriosis, fibroid disease, and infertility. She was awarded a patent in 1989 for developing a new method of determining fertility in women using clomifene.

In 1990, Comite was awarded a second patent for the use of Clomifene to increase bone mass in premenopausal women. Alongside her work in precision medicine and integrated medical analysis, she is also known for founding Women's Health at Yale in 1992. Comite is known for her work in clinical hormone research, and as the founder of Women's Health at Yale in the early 1990s.

== Field of study ==
Comite is known for having an integrated approach to health care delivery using precision medicine. She has researched hormonal changes and aging, and in particular, issues of Hypogonadism (Low T) in men and how it impacts the onset of certain associated diseases such as type 2 diabetes and heart disease.

Her research involves studying delivery systems and how they impact health outcomes; it has been her focus as a Senior Clinical and Research Adviser to the Offices of Alternative Medicine (OAM) at NIH.

== Education and early career ==
Comite graduated summa cum laude from Brooklyn College of the City University of New York Yale University School of Medicine; she was an associate clinical professor on the Yale faculty for 25 years; She founded Women's Health at Yale in 1988. Comite completed a fellowship in Reproductive Endocrinology, incorporating training in Medicine, Pediatrics, Gynecology and Andrology, at the National Institute of Child Health and Human Development at NIH. In early 1980, she was researching the use of Gonadotropin-releasing hormones to treat precocious puberty.

Comite had researched in the area of complementary and alternative medicine (CAM).

Comite has served on advisory councils and committees with the NIH, the Egyptian Ministry of Health, and on the Balance Documentary Medical Advisory Board, the Age Management Medicine Group, Independent Doctors of New York, and the American Fertility Society as well as Alpha Omega Alpha.

== Awards ==
Alan P. Mintz, MD Award for Clinical Excellence in Age Management Medicine, 2013.
