= Endometrosis =

Chronic degenerative syndrome in mares

Endometrosis is a chronic degenerative syndrome of the lining of the uterus (the endometrium) in mares. There are no explicit symptoms and the cause is also unknown, but the severity of endometrosis increases in parallel with the age and number of pregnancies of the mare. Endometrosis is confirmed by histological examination of an endometrial biopsy, which shows degeneration of blood vessels in the endometrium, and fibrosis of the tissue, along with the development of endometrial cysts. The most common classification for endometrosis in mares was published by KENNY u. DOIG (1986) and modified by SCHOON et al. (1992). The different degrees of endometriosis are divided into stage I, IIA, IIB and III. These changes cause subfertility; in pregnant mares, the changes in the endometrium can cause the placenta to fail, leading to miscarriage of the foal. Foals which are delivered at full term may be underdeveloped (dysmature). No effective treatment is known. Since the causes of endometrosis are unsettled there is not known much about how to prevent it.

The etymology of endometrosis is from the Greek endos (inside), metra (womb) and -osis (disease). This term was adopted in 1992; prior to that, endometrosis was variously known as chronic degenerative endometritis, endometrial fibrosis, or chronic endometrial disease.

== Symptoms and Occurrence ==
There are no explicit symptoms, but suspicious are mares with low infertility or embryonic deaths. Endometrosis occurs most commonly in older mares or mares that have foaled at least twice, but in general all ages can be affected. However, there seems to be no relation between the occurrence or degree of endometrosis and the number of previous foalings. Also natural seasonal and cyclical changes in the endometrium seem to not affect the disease.

== Causes and Pathogenesis ==
The causes of endometrosis are still unsettled. Most of the time endometrosis co-occurs with endometritis which may activate the periglandular fibrotic stroma cells, but it hasn't been proven. Endometrial periglandular fibrosis are the most common abnormalities that occur in mares with endometrosis. When the periglandular endometrial stromal cells look and function atypical it is a first sign for endometrosis. Mares who suffer from endometrosis seem to be unable to produce enough histotrophe, which leads to an embryonic loss of the foal.

== Classification ==
The degree of endometrial fibrosis is classified by different systems based on histopathological examination. The most common is the classification by KENNY u. DOIG (1986) which was modified by SCHOON et al. (1992). The classification is divided into three or rather four stages (I, IIA, IIB, III) which consider degenerative endometrial changes based on degree of fibrosis, glandular alteration and glandular nests with or without periglandular fibrosis and glandular atrophy. The staging is influenced by different factors like taking a biopsy during or not during breeding season or histopathological examination after treatment against the endometritis which co-occurs most of the time.

=== Stages ===
The following table shows the different degrees of endometrosis which is classified by KENNY u. DOIG (1986) and modified by SCHOON et al. (1992).

Category	Degree	Histopathological view	Expected foaling rate
I	very low	endometrium is unaltered; isolated foci of fibrosis and inflammation	80-90%
IIA	low	diffuse inflammation; low periglandular fibrosis and small fibrotic nests (<2 foci); partial atrophy in late breeding season; lymphatic lacunae	50-80%
IIB	moderate	category IIA; focal inflammation; widespread periglandular fibrosis and fibrotic nests (2-5 foci); widespread lymphatic changes	10-50%
III	high	category IIB; high focal inflammation; widespread periglandular fibrosis and fibrotic nests (>4 foci); atrophy during breeding season; severe lymphatic lacunae	<10%

== Diagnosis ==
Endometrosis is most often diagnosed in barren mares. For the diagnostic procedure the endometrium of mares are biopsied to examine the changes in the endometrium under microscope. Therefore a small piece of tissue is removed from the endometrium of the mare, which is subjected to conventional histopathology. The only contraindication for endometrial biopsy is pregnancy.

== Treatment ==
As the changes in the endometrium are seen as irreversible there is no effective treatment available. But to prevent infection antibiotics are administered in the uterus

== Prevention and Prognosis ==
Since the causes of endometrosis are unsettled there is not known much about how to prevent it. But a good breeding management seems important to lower the chance of mares becoming endometrosis. Endometrosis is more common in mares that have been used irregularly for breeding. Also strict veterinary supervision increases the foaling rates of mares significantly. As endometrosis is a chronic disease the mare will remain unfertile and the foal may be underdeveloped.
