= Endometrial cup =

Endometrial Cups

Endometrial cups form during pregnancy in mares and are the source of equine chorionic gonadotropin (eCG) and a placenta-associated structure, which is derived from the fetus. Their purpose is to increase the immunological tolerance of the mare in order to protect the developing foal.

== Function ==
Endometrial cups are unique to animals in the horse family, and so named because of their concave shape. They are a placenta-associated structure, found in the uterine wall of a mare from about 38 to 150 days into a pregnancy. After about 70 days, they begin to regress, and are eventually destroyed by the immune system. They begin to develop at approximately 25 days of pregnancy, deriving from the chorionic girdle. At approximately 36–38 days of pregnancy, the cells that will become the endometrial cup begin to burrow into the endometrial tissue, through the basement membrane, and into the uterine stroma. Their invasion of the uterine stroma begins the cells' maturation process, which takes 2–3 days. Endometrial cups can be circular, U-shaped, or ribbonlike and are pale compared to the rest of the endometrial tissue. They can range in size from 1 cm to 10 cm in diameter at the widest point. They resemble ulcers in form, and when examined under a microscope have large epithelioid decidual-like cells and large nucleoli.

They produce high concentrations of equine chorionic gonadotropin (eCG), also called pregnant mare's serum gonadotropin, in the bloodstream of pregnant mares. eCG is actually an equine luteinizing hormone. Endometrial cups behave somewhat like cells from metastatic tumors, in that they leave the placenta and migrate into the uterus. Their purpose appears to be to work with other placental cells to control the expression of histocompatibility genes so that the developing fetus is not destroyed by the mare's immune system.

Similar types of cells that invade the placenta have been described in humans. The purpose of these cells In both humans and horses is believed to be to interact with the mother's immune system and increase maternal immunological tolerance of the developing fetus.

== Histology ==
Mature endometrial cup cells appear rounded and secrete eCG; all but a few cells have two nuclei. As the mare's immune system begins to react to the presence of the pregnancy, histological changes are visible. First, as the endometrial cup grows and develops, maternal white blood cells, including T cells, B cells, and macrophages, mass in the uterine stroma. They begin to destroy the cup around days 70-80 of pregnancy, and it is completely destroyed by 100–140 days, at which point it naturally separates from the endometrium.

== See also ==
- Endometrium
