= Follicle-stimulating hormone =

Gonadotropin that regulates the development of reproductive processes

glycoprotein hormones, alpha polypeptide
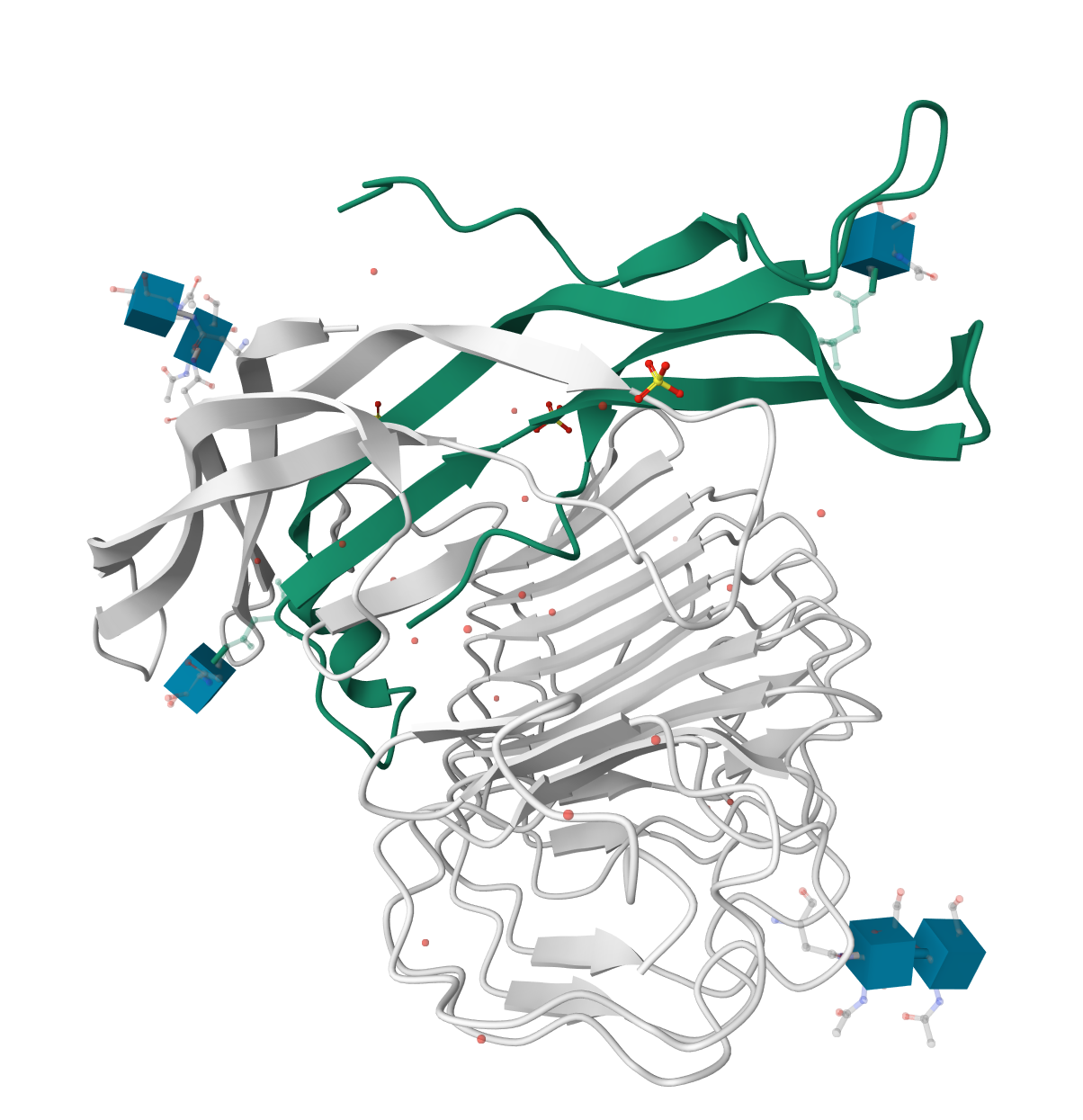
- FSH (α-FSH (green), β-FSH (grey)) with receptors (grey)

Identifiers
- Symbol: CGA
- NCBI gene: 1081
- HGNC: 1885
- OMIM: 118850
- RefSeq: NM_000735
- UniProt: P01215

Other data
- Locus: Chr. 6 q14-q21
Search for
- Structures: Swiss-model
- Domains: InterPro

Follicle-stimulating hormone, beta polypeptide
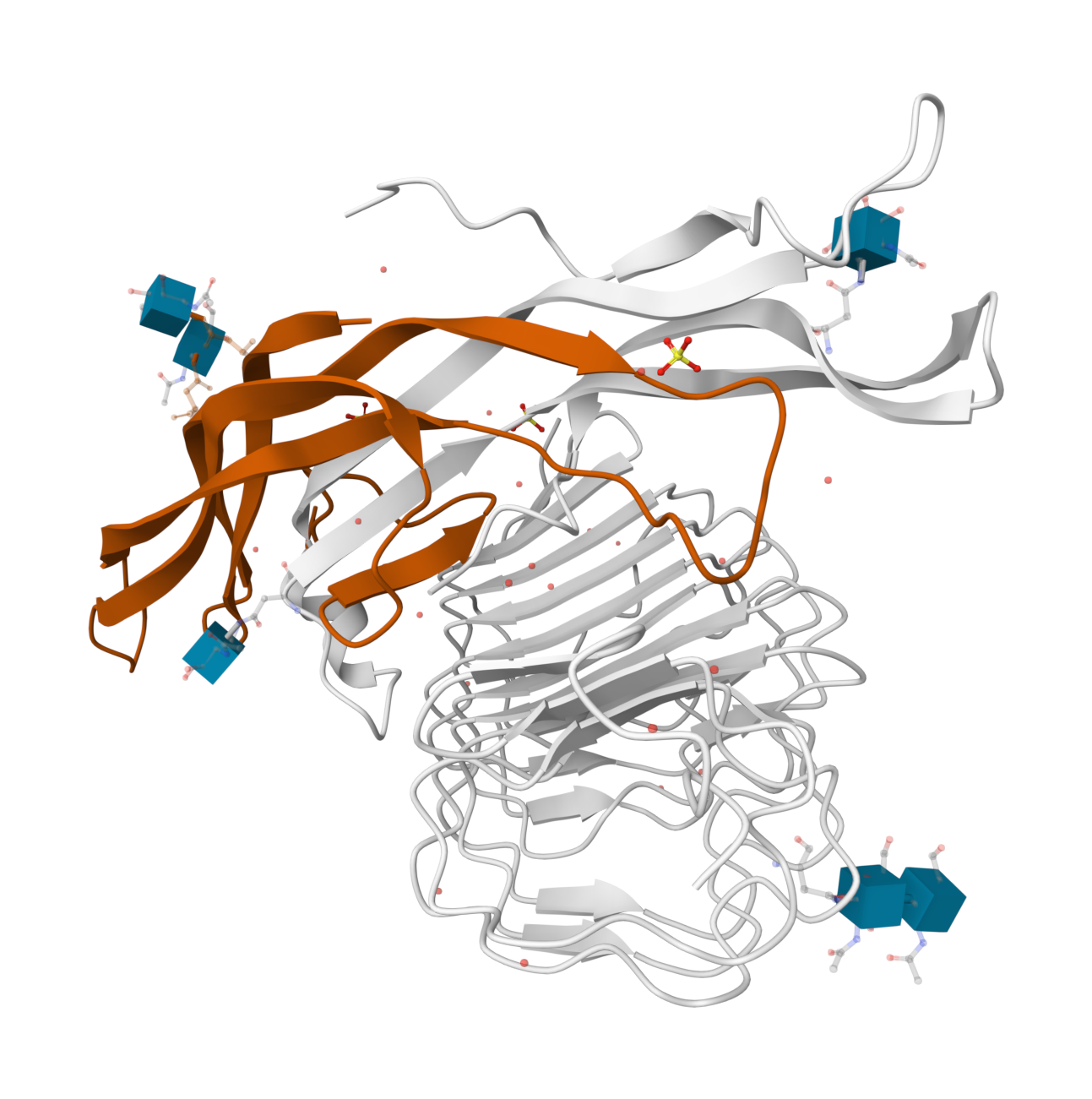
- FSH (α-FSH (grey), β-FSH (brown)) with receptors (grey)

Identifiers
- Symbol: FSHB
- NCBI gene: 2488
- HGNC: 3964
- OMIM: 136530
- RefSeq: NM_000510
- UniProt: P01225

Other data
- Locus: Chr. 11 p13
Search for
- Structures: Swiss-model
- Domains: InterPro

Follicle-stimulating hormone (FSH) is a gonadotropin, a glycoprotein polypeptide hormone. FSH is synthesized and secreted by the gonadotropic cells of the anterior pituitary gland and regulates the development, growth, pubertal maturation, and reproductive processes of the body. FSH and luteinizing hormone (LH) work together in the reproductive system.

== Structure ==
FSH is a 35.5 kDa glycoprotein heterodimer, consisting of two polypeptide units, alpha and beta. Its structure is similar to those of luteinizing hormone (LH), thyroid-stimulating hormone (TSH), and human chorionic gonadotropin (hCG). The alpha subunits of the glycoproteins LH, FSH, TSH, and hCG are identical and consist of 96 amino acids, while the beta subunits vary. Both subunits are required for biological activity. FSH has a beta subunit of 111 amino acids (FSH β), which confers its specific biologic action, and is responsible for interaction with the follicle-stimulating hormone receptor. The sugar portion of the hormone is covalently bonded to asparagine, and is composed of N-acetylgalactosamine, mannose, N-acetylglucosamine, galactose, and sialic acid.

== Genes ==
In humans, the gene for the alpha subunit is located at cytogenetic location 6q14.3. It is expressed in two cell types, most notably the basophils of the anterior pituitary. The gene for the FSH beta subunit is located on chromosome 11p13, and is expressed in gonadotropes of the pituitary cells, controlled by GnRH, inhibited by inhibin, and enhanced by activin.

== Activity and functions ==
FSH regulates the development, growth, pubertal maturation and reproductive processes of the human body.

- In both males and females, FSH stimulates the maturation of primordial germ cells.
- In males, FSH induces Sertoli cells to secrete androgen-binding proteins (ABPs), regulated by inhibin's negative feedback mechanism on the anterior pituitary. Specifically, activation of Sertoli cells by FSH sustains spermatogenesis and stimulates inhibin B secretion.
- In females, FSH initiates follicular growth, specifically affecting granulosa cells. With the concomitant rise in inhibin B, FSH levels then decline in the late follicular phase. This seems to be critical in selecting only the most advanced follicle to proceed to ovulation. At the end of the luteal phase, there is a slight rise in FSH that seems to be of importance to start the next ovulatory cycle.

Control of FSH release from the pituitary gland is unknown. Low frequency gonadotropin-releasing hormone (GnRH) pulses increase FSH mRNA levels in the rat, but is not directly correlated with an increase in circulating FSH. GnRH has been shown to play an important role in the secretion of FSH, with hypothalamic–pituitary disconnection leading to a cessation of FSH. GnRH administration leads to a return of FSH secretion. FSH is subject to oestrogen feed-back from the gonads via the hypothalamic pituitary gonadal axis.

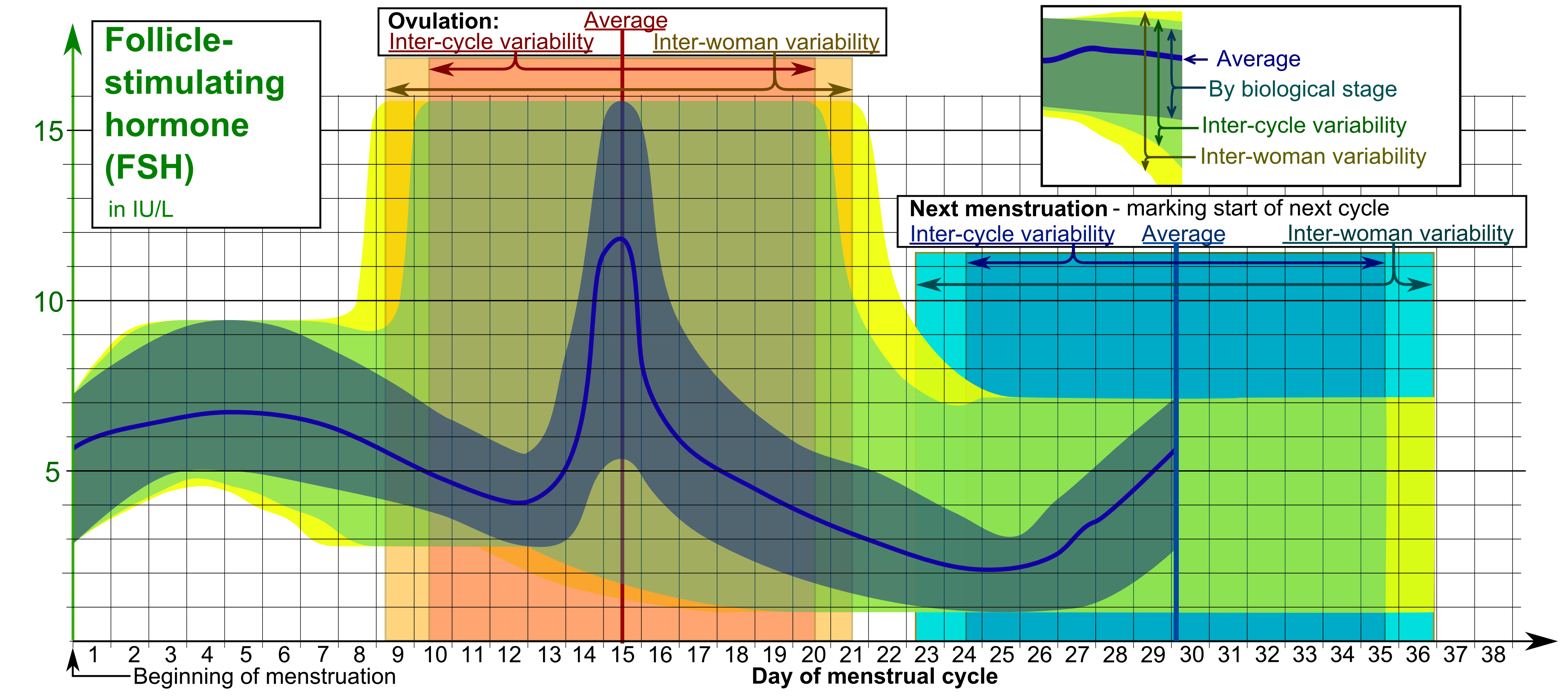
Reference ranges for the blood content of follicle-stimulating hormone levels during the menstrual cycle.: The ranges denoted By biological stage may be used in closely monitored menstrual cycles in regard to other markers of its biological progression, with the time scale being compressed or stretched to how much faster or slower, respectively, the cycle progresses compared to an average cycle.; The ranges denoted Inter-cycle variability are more appropriate to use in non-monitored cycles with only the beginning of menstruation known, but where the woman accurately knows her average cycle lengths and time of ovulation, and that they are somewhat averagely regular, with the time scale being compressed or stretched to how much a woman's average cycle length is shorter or longer, respectively, than the average of the population.; The ranges denoted Inter-woman variability are more appropriate to use when the average cycle lengths and time of ovulation are unknown, but only the beginning of menstruation is given.

=== Effects in females ===
FSH stimulates the growth and recruitment of immature ovarian follicles in the ovary. In early (small) antral follicles, FSH is the major survival factor that rescues the small antral follicles (2–5 mm in diameter for humans) from apoptosis (programmed death of the somatic cells of the follicle and oocyte). In the luteal-follicle phase transition period the serum levels of progesterone and estrogen (primarily estradiol) decrease and no longer suppress the release of FSH, consequently FSH peaks at about day three (day one is the first day of menstrual flow). The cohort of small antral follicles is normally sufficient in number to produce enough Inhibin B to lower FSH serum levels.

In addition, there is evidence that gonadotropin surge-attenuating factor produced by small follicles during the first half of the follicle phase also exerts a negative feedback on pulsatile luteinizing hormone (LH) secretion amplitude, thus allowing a more favorable environment for follicle growth and preventing premature luteinization.

As a woman nears perimenopause, the number of small antral follicles recruited in each cycle diminishes and consequently insufficient Inhibin B is produced to fully lower FSH and the serum level of FSH begins to rise. Eventually, the FSH level becomes so high that downregulation of FSH receptors occurs and by postmenopause any remaining small secondary follicles no longer have FSH nor LH receptors.

When the follicle matures and reaches 8–10 mm in diameter it starts to secrete significant amounts of estradiol. Normally in humans only one follicle becomes dominant and survives to grow to 18–30 mm in size and ovulate, the remaining follicles in the cohort undergo atresia. The sharp increase in estradiol production by the dominant follicle (possibly along with a decrease in gonadotrophin surge-attenuating factor) cause a positive effect on the hypothalamus and pituitary and rapid GnRH pulses occur and an LH surge results.

The increase in serum estradiol levels causes a decrease in FSH production by inhibiting GnRH production in the hypothalamus.

The decrease in serum FSH level causes the smaller follicles in the current cohort to undergo atresia as they lack sufficient sensitivity to FSH to survive. Occasionally two follicles reach the 10 mm stage at the same time by chance and as both are equally sensitive to FSH both survive and grow in the low FSH environment and thus two ovulations can occur in one cycle possibly leading to non-identical (dizygotic) twins.

=== Effects in males ===
FSH stimulates primary spermatocytes to undergo the first division of meiosis, to form secondary spermatocytes.

FSH enhances the production of androgen-binding protein by the Sertoli cells of the testes by binding to FSH receptors on their basolateral membranes, and is critical for the initiation of spermatogenesis.

== Measurement ==
Follicle-stimulating hormone is typically measured in the early follicular phase of the menstrual cycle, typically day three to five, counted from last menstruation. At this time, the levels of estradiol (E2) and progesterone are at the lowest point of the menstrual cycle. FSH levels in this time is often called basal FSH levels, to distinguish from the increased levels when approaching ovulation.

FSH is measured in international units (IU). For Human Urinary FSH, one IU is defined as the amount of FSH that has an activity corresponding to 0.11388 mg of pure Human Urinary FSH. For recombinant FSH, one IU corresponds to approximately 0.065 to 0.075 μg of a "fill-by-mass" product. The mean values for women before ovulation are around (3.8-8.8) IU/L. After ovulation these levels drop to between (1.8-5.1) IU/L. At the mid of the menstrual cycle it reaches its highest value, between (4.5-22.5) IU/L. During menopause, the values goes up even more, between (16.74-113.59) IU/L. For men, the mean values are around (1.5-12.4) IU/L.

== Disease states ==
FSH levels are normally low during childhood and, in females, high after menopause.

=== High FSH levels ===
The most common reason for high serum FSH concentration is in a female who is undergoing or has recently undergone menopause. High levels of FSH indicate that the normal restricting feedback from the gonad is absent, leading to an unrestricted pituitary FSH production. FSH may contribute to postmenopausal osteoporosis and cardiovascular disease.

If high FSH levels occur during the reproductive years, it is abnormal. Conditions with high FSH levels include:

1. Premature menopause also known as premature ovarian failure
2. Poor ovarian reserve also known as premature ovarian aging
3. Gonadal dysgenesis, Turner syndrome, Klinefelter syndrome
4. Castration
5. Swyer syndrome
6. Certain forms of congenital adrenal hyperplasia
7. Testicular failure
8. Lupus

Most of these conditions are associated with subfertility or infertility. Therefore, high FSH levels are an indication of subfertility or infertility.

=== Low FSH levels ===
Diminished secretion of FSH can result in failure of gonadal function (hypogonadism). This condition is typically manifested in males as failure in production of normal numbers of sperm. In females, cessation of reproductive cycles is commonly observed. Conditions with very low FSH secretions are:

1. Polyendocrine metabolic ovarian syndrome
2. Polyendocrine metabolic ovarian syndrome + obesity + hirsutism + infertility
3. Kallmann syndrome
4. Aromatase excess syndrome
5. Hypothalamic suppression
6. Hypopituitarism
7. Hyperprolactinemia
8. Gonadotropin deficiency
9. Gonadal suppression therapy
  1. GnRH antagonist
  2. GnRH agonist (downregulation).

Isolated FSH deficiency due to mutations in the gene for β-subunit of FSH is rare with 13 cases reported in the literature up to 2019.

== Use as therapy ==
FSH is used commonly in infertility therapy, mainly for ovarian hyperstimulation as part of IVF. In some cases, it is used in ovulation induction for reversal of anovulation as well.

FSH is available mixed with LH activity in various menotropins including more purified forms of urinary gonadotropins such as Menopur, as well as without LH activity as recombinant FSH (Gonapure, Gonal F, Follistim, Follitropin alpha).

== Potential role in vascularization of solid tumors ==
Elevated FSH receptor levels have been detected in the endothelia of tumor vasculature in a very wide range of solid tumors. FSH binding is thought to upregulate neovascularization via at least two mechanisms – one in the VEGF pathway, and the other VEGF independent – related to the development of umbilical vasculature when physiological. This presents possible use of FSH and FSH-receptor antagonists as an anti-tumor angiogenesis therapy (cf. avastin for current anti-VEGF approaches).

== See also ==
- EFSH, a follicle-stimulating hormone obtained from equine species
