= Equine chorionic gonadotropin =

Equine chorionic gonadotropin (acronym given as eCG but not to be confused with ECG) is a gonadotropic hormone produced in the chorion of pregnant mares. Previously referred to as pregnant mare's serum gonadotropin (PMSG), the hormone is commonly used in concert with progestogen to induce ovulation in livestock prior to artificial insemination.

Pregnant mares secrete the hormone from their endometrial cups between 40 and 130 days into their gestation, and once collected, it has been used to artificially induce estrus in female sheep, goats, cattle, and swine. Despite being less pure than pituitary extracts from sheep, goats or swine, PMSG tends to be used because of its longer circulatory half-life. In equids PMSG has only LH like activity, but in other species it has activity like both follicle-stimulating hormone (FSH) and luteinizing hormone (LH).

Equine CG, like all glycoprotein hormones, is composed of two dissimilar subunits named alpha and beta. The alpha subunit is common to all glycoprotein hormones (LH, FSH, TSH, CG). The beta subunits are hormone-specific and are responsible for receptor binding specificity, although CG binds to the same luteinizing hormone/choriogonadotropin receptor as LH. In the equids (horses, donkeys, zebras), the placental CGs and pituitary LH are expressed from the same gene and thus have the same protein sequence, differing only by their carbohydrate side-chains (particularly in their respective beta subunits).

== Criticism ==
The Swiss-based Animal Welfare Foundation has criticized how eCG is obtained from horse blood collected by inhumane practices in Uruguayan, Argentinian, and Icelandic horse farms, as documented in undercover videos shot there.

A documentary was released in 2023 regarding the hormone.
