= POLR3E =

Protein-coding gene in the species Homo sapiens

Identifiers
- Aliases: POLR3E, RPC5, SIN, polymerase (RNA) III subunit E, RNA polymerase III subunit E, C37
- External IDs: OMIM: 617815; MGI: 1349452; GeneCards: POLR3E

Gene location (Human)
Chr.	Chromosome 16 (human)
Band	16p12.2	Start	22,297,375 bp
Band	16p12.2	End	22,335,101 bp

Gene location (Mouse)
Chr.	Chromosome 7 (mouse)
Band	7|7 F2	Start	120,516,967 bp
Band	7|7 F2	End	120,546,655 bp
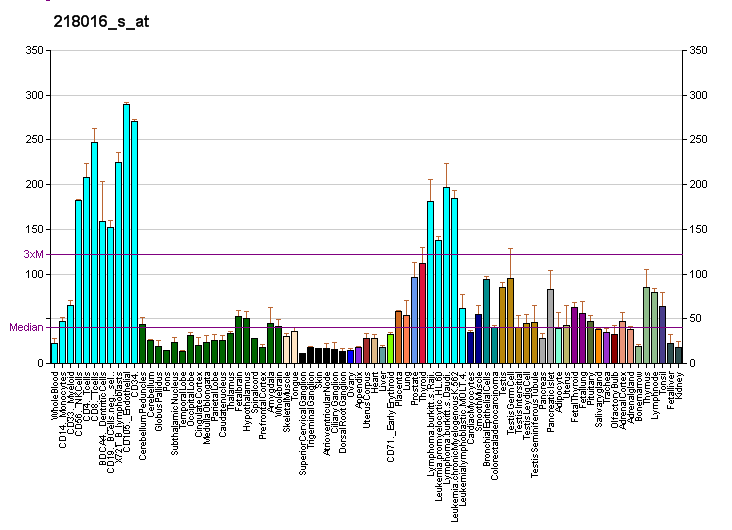
RNA expression pattern
Bgee	Human / Mouse (ortholog); Top expressed in: gastrocnemius muscle; muscle of thigh; body of pancreas; left lobe of thyroid gland; anterior pituitary; right lobe of thyroid gland; skin of leg; skin of abdomen; right uterine tube; left ovary / Top expressed in: right kidney; proximal tubule; human kidney; epiblast; hair follicle; seminiferous tubule; endothelial cell of lymphatic vessel; condyle; yolk sac; Paneth cell; More reference expression data
BioGPS	More reference expression data
Gene ontology
Molecular function	DNA-directed 5'-3' RNA polymerase activity; RNA polymerase III activity
Cellular component	RNA polymerase III complex; cytosol; nucleus; nucleoplasm
Biological process	immune system process; defense response to virus; transcription, DNA-templated; transcription by RNA polymerase III; innate immune response; positive regulation of type I interferon production
Sources:Amigo / QuickGO
Orthologs
Databases	NCBI: entry; OMA: entry
Species	Human	Mouse
Entrez	55718	26939
Ensembl	ENSG00000284282; ENSG00000058600	ENSMUSG00000030880
UniProt	Q9NVU0	Q9CZT4
RefSeq (mRNA)	NM_001258033; NM_001258034; NM_001258035; NM_001258036; NM_018119	NM_001164096; NM_025298; NM_001379288
RefSeq (protein)	NP_001244962; NP_001244963; NP_001244964; NP_001244965; NP_060589	NP_001157568; NP_079574; NP_001366217
Location (UCSC)	Chr 16: 22.3 – 22.34 Mb	Chr 7: 120.52 – 120.55 Mb
PubMed search
- Wikidata
View/Edit Human	View/Edit Mouse

DNA-directed RNA polymerase III subunit RPC5 is an enzyme that in humans is encoded by the POLR3E gene.

== Interactions ==
POLR3E has been shown to interact with POLR3D.
