= POLR3D =

Protein-coding gene in the species Homo sapiens

Identifiers
- Aliases: POLR3D, BN51T, RPC4, RPC53, TSBN51, polymerase (RNA) III subunit D, RNA polymerase III subunit D, C53
- External IDs: OMIM: 187280; MGI: 1914315; GeneCards: POLR3D

Gene location (Human)
| Chr. | Chromosome 8 (human) |
| Band | 8p21.3 | Start | 22,245,133 bp |
| Band | 8p21.3 | End | 22,254,601 bp |

Gene location (Mouse)
| Chr. | Chromosome 14 (mouse) |
| Band | 14|14 D2 | Start | 70,676,197 bp |
| Band | 14|14 D2 | End | 70,680,887 bp |
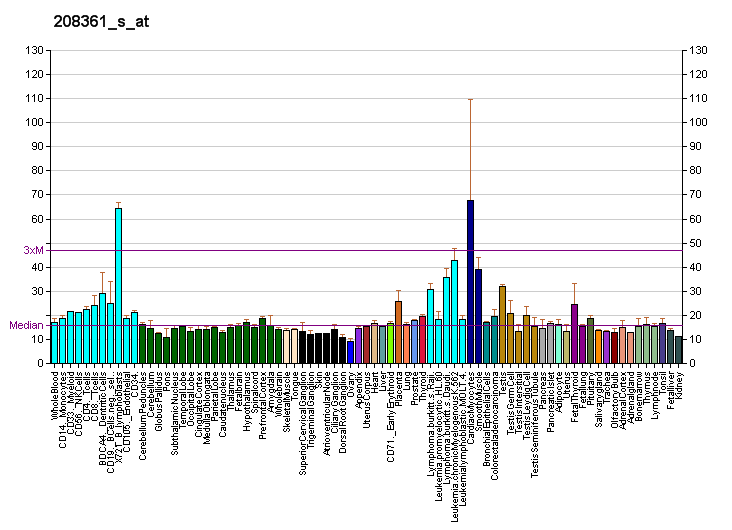
RNA expression pattern
| Bgee | Human / Mouse (ortholog); Top expressed in: sural nerve; stromal cell of endometrium; Achilles tendon; gastrocnemius muscle; muscle of thigh; islet of Langerhans; ventricular zone; ganglionic eminence; left testis; right testis / Top expressed in: otic placode; saccule; otic vesicle; yolk sac; tail of embryo; ventricular zone; muscle of thigh; epiblast; embryo; embryo; More reference expression data |
| BioGPS | More reference expression data |
Gene ontology
| Molecular function | DNA-directed 5'-3' RNA polymerase activity; DNA binding; chromatin binding; RNA polymerase III activity |
| Cellular component | RNA polymerase III complex; nucleus; nucleoplasm; cytosol; nuclear speck |
| Biological process | positive regulation of interferon-beta production; immune system process; defense response to virus; positive regulation of innate immune response; transcription by RNA polymerase III; innate immune response; positive regulation of type I interferon production |
Sources:Amigo / QuickGO
Orthologs
| Databases | NCBI: entry; OMA: entry |
| Species | Human | Mouse |
| Entrez | 661 | 67065 |
| Ensembl | ENSG00000168495 | ENSMUSG00000000776 |
| UniProt | P05423 | Q91WD1 |
| RefSeq (mRNA) | NM_001722 | NM_001164082; NM_025945 |
| RefSeq (protein) | NP_001713 | NP_001157554; NP_080221 |
| Location (UCSC) | Chr 8: 22.25 – 22.25 Mb | Chr 14: 70.68 – 70.68 Mb |
| PubMed search |
- Wikidata
| View/Edit Human | View/Edit Mouse |

DNA-directed RNA polymerase III subunit RPC4 is an enzyme that in humans is encoded by the POLR3D gene.

This gene complements a temperature-sensitive mutant isolated from the BHK-21 Syrian hamster cell line. It leads to a block in progression through the G1 phase of the cell cycle at nonpermissive temperatures.

== Interactions ==
POLR3D has been shown to interact with POLR3E.
