= Methaniazide =

Chemical compound

Clinical data
- Trade names: Erbazid, Neoiscotin, Neo-Iscotin, Nesticide, Neotizide, Neo-Tizide
- Other names: Metaniazide; Neotizide; Isoniazid methanesulfonate; Isoniazid methanosulfonate; Isoniazid mesylate; Isonicotinic acid hydrazide methanesulfonate

Identifiers
- IUPAC name: [2-(Pyridine-4-carbonyl)hydrazinyl]methanesulfonic acid
- CAS Number: 13447-95-5 3804-89-5 (sodium)
- PubChem CID: 3769
- ChemSpider: 3637
- UNII: GN8S7ZES0F
- KEGG: D08198
- ChEBI: CHEBI:134943
- ChEMBL: ChEMBL2105190
- CompTox Dashboard (EPA): DTXSID2048248
- ECHA InfoCard: 100.033.264

Chemical and physical data
- Formula: C_{7}H_{9}N_{3}O_{4}S
- Molar mass: 231.23 g·mol^{−1}
- 3D model (JSmol): Interactive image
- SMILES: C1=CN=CC=C1C(=O)NNCS(=O)(=O)O
- InChI: InChI=1S/C7H9N3O4S/c11-7(6-1-3-8-4-2-6)10-9-5-15(12,13)14/h1-4,9H,5H2,(H,10,11)(H,12,13,14); Key:GQZQCROBCYNTMU-UHFFFAOYSA-N

Methaniazide, brand name Neotizide among others, is an antibiotic which was used in the treatment of tuberculosis. It is a derivative of methanesulfonic acid and isoniazid, which is also an antituberculosis drug but has comparatively been far more widely known and used. Isoniazid is a prodrug of isonicotinic acid, and acetylisoniazid, a metabolite of isoniazid, is a metabolic intermediate through which most of the isonicotinic acid is formed. Methaniazide features its mesylate group at the same position as that of the acetyl group in acetylisoniazid, and so methaniazide probably acts as a prodrug of isonicotinic acid similarly to isoniazid and acetylisoniazid. Methaniazide is used as the sodium salt. It was never approved for use or sale in the United States.

Neothetazone is an antibiotic combination of methaniazide (neotizide) and thioacetazone which was previously used in the treatment of tuberculosis. It has been associated with a case report of gigantomastia. Similarly, there have been a variety of case reports in the literature of gynecomastia associated with isoniazid treatment.
