= Breast growth =

Breast growth may refer to:

- The growth of the breast, see breast development
- Mammoplasia, the enlargement of the breast
- A growth inside the breast, see breast lump
