= Anisomastia =

- Specialty: Plastic surgery

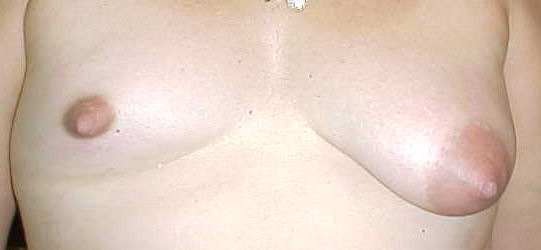
Female breasts with anisomastia

Anisomastia is a medical condition in which there is a severe asymmetry or unequalness in the size of the breasts, generally related to a difference in volume. In other words, when one of the breasts is much larger than the other. In contrast to anisomastia, a slight asymmetry of the breasts is common. Anisomastia may be corrected by surgical breast augmentation or reduction.

== See also ==
- Micromastia
- Breast hypertrophy
