= Breast atrophy =

Shrinkage of the breasts

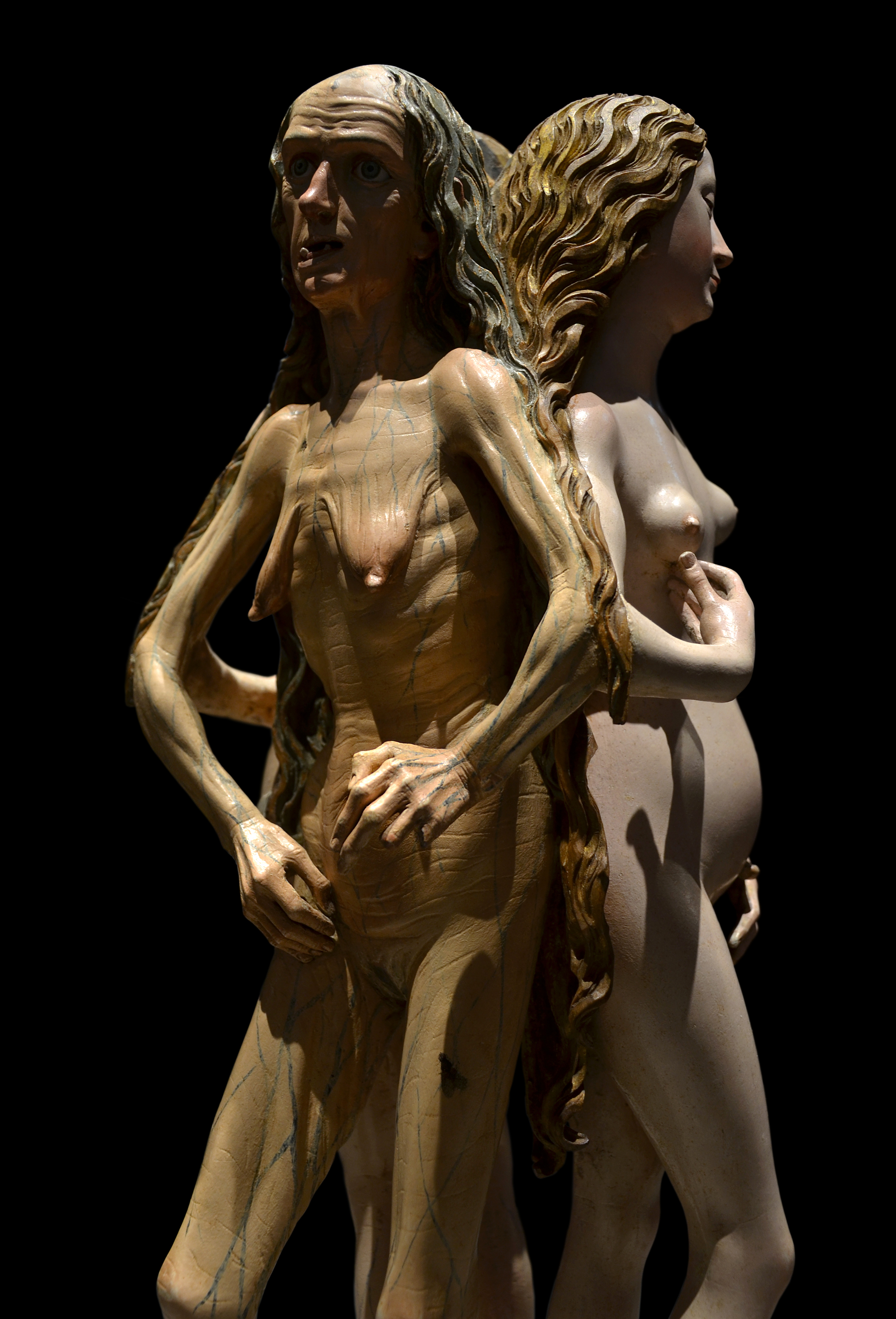
- 15th century sculpture depicting breast atrophy
- Specialty: Medical genetics

Breast atrophy is the normal or spontaneous atrophy or shrinkage of the breasts.

Breast atrophy commonly occurs in women during menopause when estrogen levels decrease. It can also be caused by hypoestrogenism and/or hyperandrogenism in women in general, such as in antiestrogen treatment for breast cancer, in polyendocrine metabolic ovarian syndrome (PMOS), and in malnutrition such as that associated with eating disorders like anorexia nervosa or with chronic disease. It can also be an effect of weight loss.

In the treatment of gynecomastia in males and macromastia in women, and in hormone replacement therapy (HRT) for trans men, breast atrophy may be a desired effect.

== See also ==
- Mammoplasia
- Micromastia
