= Mark Eden bust developer =

Device purporting to increase bust size

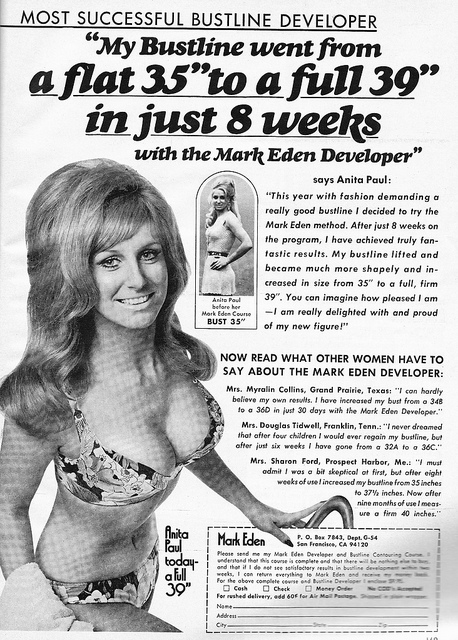
The Mark Eden bust developer was widely advertised in women's magazines of the 1960s and 1970s.

The Mark Eden bust developer was a device and regimen sold by the Mark Eden company of San Francisco, California, that promised to enlarge a woman's breasts. Jack and Eileen Feather, California based figure salon entrepreneurs, were the promoters of the device. The product was widely marketed in women's magazines during the 1960s and 1970s, making claims such as, "For thousands, Mark Eden has transformed flat bustlines into firm, shapely fullness." Its makers withdrew the product from the market following their indictment for mail fraud.

== The product ==
The product consisted of a regimen of exercises using a clamshell-like device with a spring to provide resistance. The device and the regimen were never illustrated or described in the advertisements, which instead usually contained pictures of women showing their breasts. To the extent that the product had any effects at all, it worked by enlarging the pectoral muscles and latissimus dorsi, which could increase the circumference of the exerciser's bustline without actually enlarging breasts. Spokeswomen for the product included June Wilkinson, the Playboy centerfold, who appeared in one edition of the product's documentation.

== Mail fraud ==
Starting in 1965, the United States Postal Service repeatedly attempted to shut the Mark Eden business down, claiming that its advertising was false and misleading. The Postal Service first ruled that the claims made for the Mark Eden bust developer in its advertising constituted mail fraud in 1966, ruling that the claims made in the original Mark Eden advertising "far exceed puffing", and that the advertisements contained "material misrepresentations", given that "(t)here is substantial evidence that the representations as set out in the attached copy of the advertisement involved in this case are false;" and "(t)hey are the kind of representations that would invite women to buy the device."

Protracted litigation between the Mark Eden business and the Postal Service was the result, leading to a consent decree and a modification of the language of the advertisements, which the Postal Service later claimed had been violated. The Mark Eden corporation then brought suit against the Postal Service, and won an injunction forbidding the Postmaster from impounding the device and funds received from its sale; this decision was affirmed on appeal in 1970.

The Mark Eden bust developer was one of several body and exercise products marketed by Feather, who also sold various other slimming and body modification products such as "Slim Jeans", an "Astro-Trimmer", a "Sauna Belt", and in the 1980s, the Cambridge Diet. Finally, in 1981, Feather was indicted on 11 counts of mail fraud. In settlement of this case, in 1983 the Mark Eden bust developer disappeared from the market, along with Feather's other body image products: the Mark II Bust Developer, the Astro Trimmer, the Astro-Jogger, the Sauna Belt Waistline Reducer, Slim-Skins, Vacu-Pants, Vacuum Pants, Hot Pants, Trim Jeans, and Dream Wrap. Feather was made to pay a $1.1 million fine.

== Impact ==
Screenwriter Nora Ephron wrote of her experiences with the Mark Eden bust developer in an essay, "A Few Words About Breasts", originally published in Esquire in 1972; the essay appears in her collection Crazy Salad. Lenny Bruce incorporated the device into his comedy routine; a recorded performance is included in the retrospective collection Let the Buyer Beware. The Mark Eden advertisements have been cited as examples of misleading language in advertisements by educators who seek to improve critical thinking skills.

== See also ==
- Breast enlargement supplements
