= Amazia =

Absence of the mammary gland

Amazia refers to a condition where one or both of the mammary glands is absent (the nipple and areola remain present). This may occur either congenitally or iatrogenically (typically the result of surgical removal and/or radiation therapy). Amazia can be treated with breast implants.

Amazia differs from amastia (the complete absence of breast tissue, nipple, and areola), although the two conditions are often (erroneously) thought to be identical. The terms "amazia" and "amastia" are thus often used interchangeably, even though the two conditions are medically different.

== See also ==
- Amastia
- Athelia
- Micromastia
