= Athelia =

Athelia may refer to:

- Athelia (disease), a congenital condition in humans where one or both nipples are absent
- Athelia (fungus), a genus of basidiomycete fungi in the family Atheliales
- not to be confused with Athaliah
