= A Few Words About Breasts =

May 1972 essay by Nora Ephron

"A Few Words About Breasts" is an essay by the American writer Nora Ephron that appeared in the May 1972 issue of Esquire. Written at the height of the second-wave feminist movement, the essay humorously explores body image and the psychological effects of being small-breasted. Numerous writers have suggested that "A Few Words About Breasts" functions as a sort of origin story for Ephron's career as a humorist.

== Publication history ==
"A Few Words About Breasts" was originally published in Esquire on May 1, 1972. It later appeared in Ephron's 1975 essay collection Crazy Salad and was reprinted in The 50 Funniest American Writers, a 2011 anthology published by the Library of America.

== Reception ==
In a 2012 interview, Ephron referred to the essay as a turning point in her career, noting that "you could look at the careers of many women writers and see that moment where they did 'the shocking thing'," offering Lillian Hellman's 1934 play The Children's Hour and Gloria Steinem's 1963 article "A Bunny's Tale" as examples. One of the shocking elements of Ephron's essay was its use of the word "shit"; the editors of Esquire asked Ephron to alter the phrase, citing the magazine's policy of banning four-letter words but Ephron threatened to withdraw the piece and the editors relented.

Ephron was unsure whether the essay would "be a huge success or be judged as a kind of 'Who needs to know any of this?' kind of thing", and upon publication it prompted an enormous amount of reader response, making Ephron "both famous and infamous". The prominent Conservative rabbi Arthur Hertzberg wrote to Esquire suggesting that Ephron return "to Beverly Hills High School where you will write on the blackboard one hundred times 'It is better to be a lady than to kiss and tell'," and in 1975 Ephron said, "I still get these endless letters saying, 'You're wrong, you're wrong.'"

In 2012 The New York Times referred to it as "one of Ms. Ephron's most memorable essays". In 2016 The Daily Beast declared it "the perfect personal essay". Ephron's friend and biographer Richard Cohen wrote that the essay "has been widely misread since 1972 as a self-deprecating trifle....But as in Heartburn, her novel that was to follow, the humor camouflaged considerable anger." In 2012, the critic Wesley Morris framed "A Few Words About Breasts" as a feminist cultural critique disguised as a comic essay, praising Ephron's use of observation, self-deprecation, and hyperbole. "Ephron was often struggling to reconcile a woman's body being this intersection of personal, public, and political space," Morris wrote, adding, "Small breasts forced Ephron to think about what her other options were as a woman".

Numerous writers have suggested that "A Few Words About Breasts" functions as a sort of origin story for Ephron's career as a humorist. In The New Yorker, Ariel Levy speculated that "If Nora Ephron had been born buxom....Harry might never have met Sally," and the comedian Jessi Klein has said, "I relate to pretty much every word of [the essay]....There is something about the struggle of having to get male attention without breasts that I think made me funnier".
