= Methaniazide/thioacetazone =

Combination drug

Combination of
- Methaniazide: Antibiotic
- Thiacetazone: Antibiotic

Legal status
- Legal status: In general: ℞ (Prescription only)

Methaniazide/thioacetazone, sold under the brand name Neothetazone, is an antibiotic combination of methaniazide (neotizide) and thioacetazone that is or was very commonly used in the treatment of tuberculosis. It has been implicated as a cause of gigantomastia in a single 1970 case report, and, along with D-penicilliamine, bucillamine, ciclosporin, and indinavir, is one of the only drugs to have been associated with gigantomastia.

== See also ==
- Conteben
- Isoniazid
