= Mammoplasia =

Normal or spontaneous enlargement of breasts

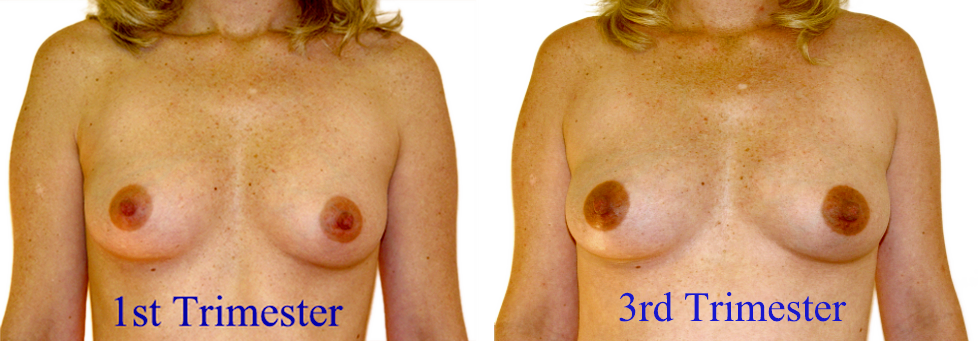
- It is normal for the breasts to enlarge during pregnancy.

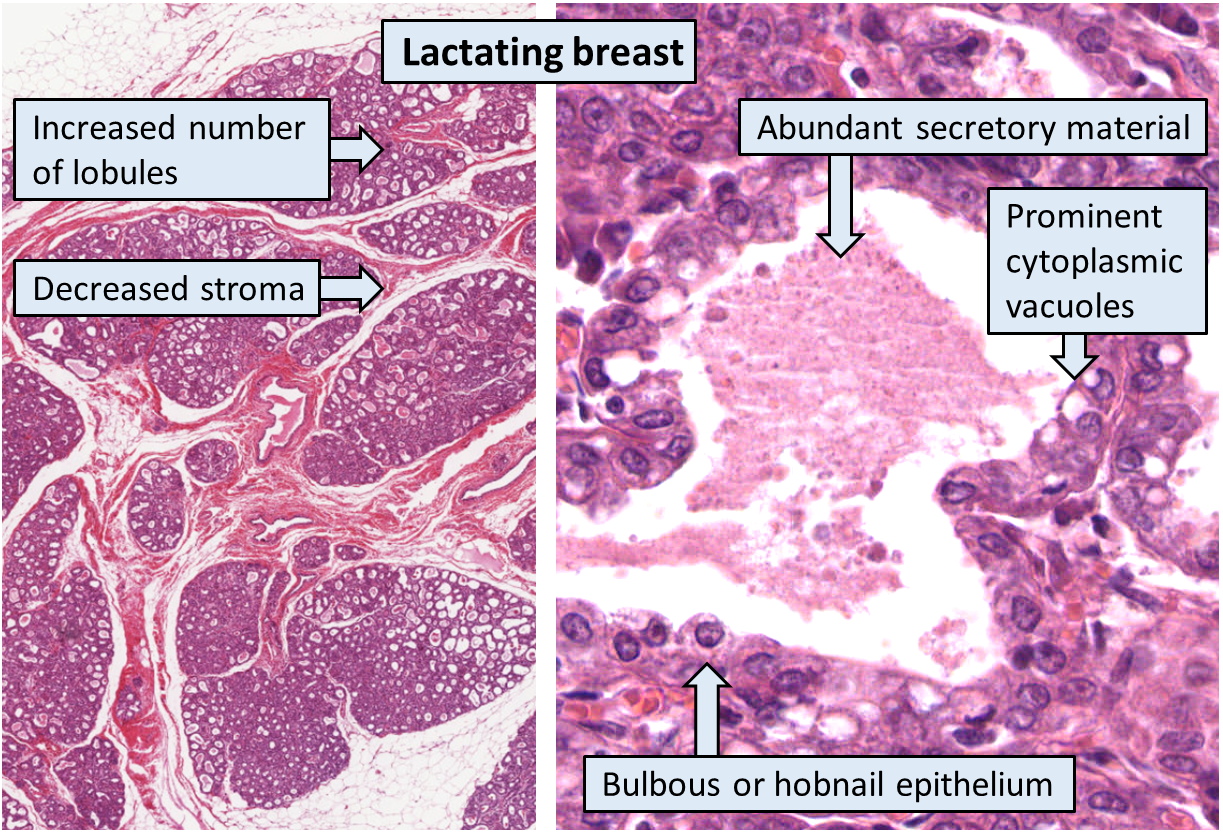
Normal histology of the breast during lactation.

Mammoplasia is the normal or spontaneous enlargement of human breasts. Mammoplasia occurs normally during puberty and pregnancy in women, as well as during certain periods of the menstrual cycle. When it occurs in males, it is called gynecomastia and is considered to be pathological. When it occurs in females and is extremely excessive, it is called macromastia (also known as gigantomastia or breast hypertrophy) and is similarly considered to be pathological. Mammoplasia may be due to breast engorgement, which is temporary enlargement of the breasts caused by the production and storage of breast milk in association with lactation and/or galactorrhea (excessive or inappropriate production of milk). Mastodynia (breast tenderness/pain) frequently co-occurs with mammoplasia.

During the luteal phase (latter half) of the menstrual cycle, due to increased mammary blood flow and/or premenstrual fluid retention caused by high circulating concentrations of estrogen and/or progesterone, the breasts temporarily increase in size, and this is experienced by women as fullness, heaviness, swollenness, and a tingling sensation.

Mammoplasia can be an effect or side effect of various drugs, including estrogens, antiandrogens such as spironolactone, cyproterone acetate, bicalutamide, and finasteride, growth hormone, and drugs that elevate prolactin levels such as D_{2} receptor antagonists like antipsychotics (e.g., risperidone), metoclopramide, and domperidone and certain antidepressants like selective serotonin reuptake inhibitors (SSRIs) and tricyclic antidepressants (TCAs). The risk appears to be less with serotonin-norepinephrine reuptake inhibitors (SNRIs) like venlafaxine. The "atypical" antidepressants mirtazapine and bupropion do not increase prolactin levels (bupropion may actually decrease prolactin levels), and hence there may be no risk with these agents. Other drugs that have been associated with mammoplasia include D-penicillamine, bucillamine, neothetazone, ciclosporin, indinavir, marijuana, and cimetidine.

A 1997 study found an association between the SSRIs and mammoplasia in 23 (39%) of its 59 female participants. Studies have also found associations between SSRIs and galactorrhea. These side effects seem to be due to hyperprolactinemia (elevated prolactin levels) induced by these drugs, an effect that appears to be caused by serotonin-mediated inhibition of tuberoinfundibular dopaminergic neurons that inhibit prolactin secretion. The mammoplasia these drugs can cause has been found to be highly correlated with concomitant weight gain (in the 1997 study, 83% of those who experienced weight gain also experienced mammoplasia, while only 30% of those who did not experience weight gain experienced mammoplasia). The mammoplasia associated with SSRIs is reported to be reversible with drug discontinuation. SSRIs have notably been associated with a modestly increased risk of breast cancer. This is in accordance with higher prolactin levels being associated with increased breast cancer risk.

In puberty induction in hypogonadal girls and in feminizing hormone therapy in transgender women, as well as hormonal breast enhancement in women with breast hypoplasia or small breasts, mammoplasia is a desired effect.

== See also ==
- Breast atrophy – Shrinkage of the breasts
- Micromastia – Abnormally underdeveloped breasts
- Galactogogue – Substance promoting lactation
