= Ulnar–mammary syndrome =

Human disease

- Other names: Schinzel syndrome
- This condition is inherited in an autosomal dominant manner.
- Specialty: Dermatology

Ulnar–mammary syndrome or Schinzel syndrome is a cutaneous (or skin) condition characterized by nipple and breast hypoplasia (or aplasia), i.e. underdevelopment. Features of UMS can be mild to severe and can vary significantly from person to person, even within the same family. The main features of UMS include upper limb defects (including abnormal or incomplete development of the fingers and forearm), underdevelopment of the apocrine and mammary glands (leading to absent breast development and the inability to produce breast milk), and various genital abnormalities. Other signs and symptoms may include hormonal deficiencies, delayed puberty (particularly in males), dental problems and obesity. People with UMS may have distinct facial features, including a wide face tapering to a prominent chin, and a broad nose.

== Genetics ==
It has been associated with TBX3. This gene is located on the long arm of chromosome 12 (12q24.21).

Another gene that has been associated with this condition is SYNM. This gene is located on the long arm of chromosome 15 (15q26.3).

== See also ==
- Carvajal syndrome
- List of cutaneous conditions
