= Adipomastia =

- Other names: Lipomastia, fatty breasts, pseudogynecomastia.
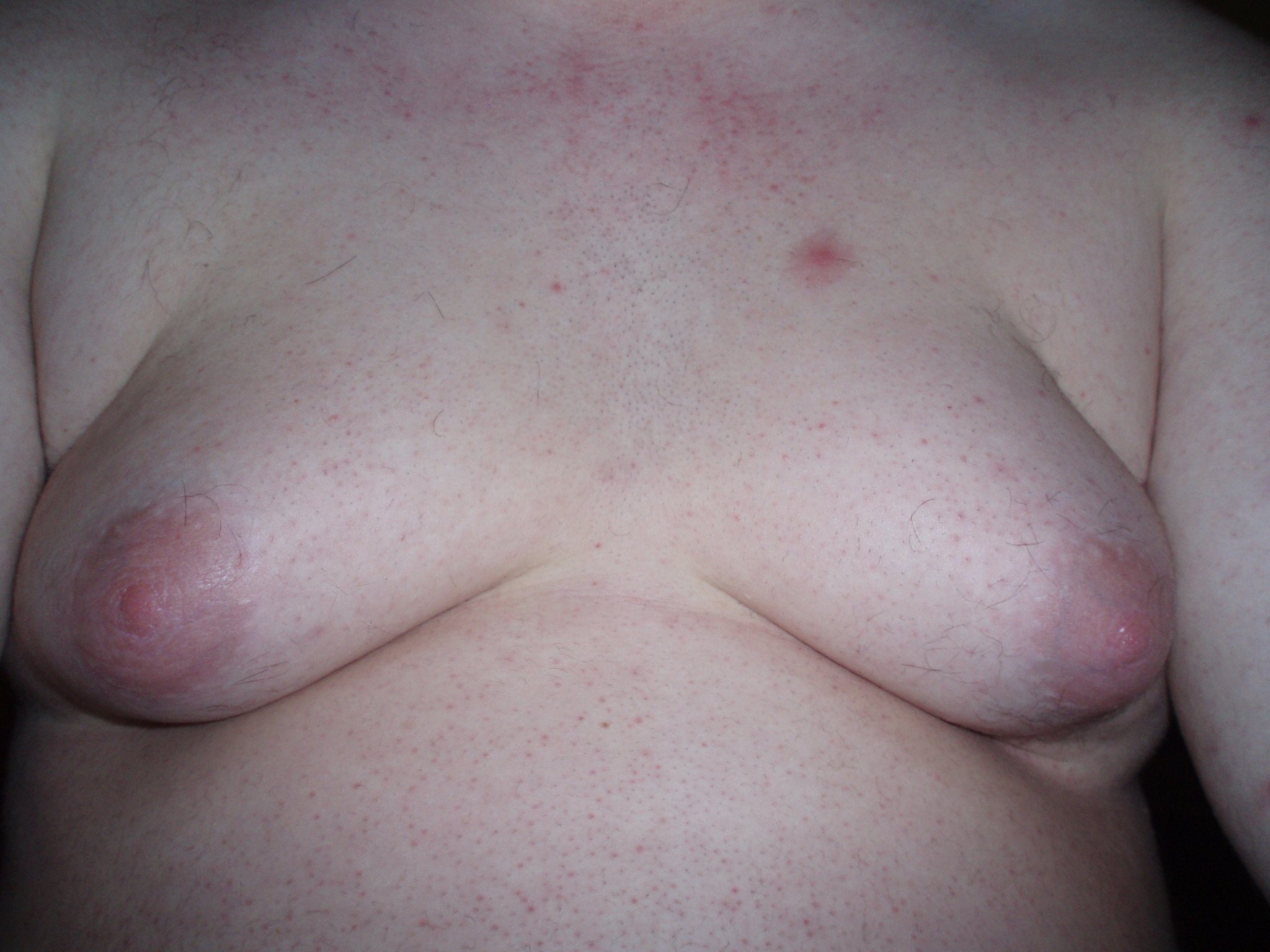
- A male with probable comorbid gynecomastia and pseudogynecomastia
- Specialty: Plastic surgery
- Symptoms: excess of skin and/or a flat layer of adipose tissue in the breasts without true gynecomastia.
- Causes: Weight loss, Weight gain
- Differential diagnosis: Gynecomastia
- Treatment: Liposuction, surgery.

Adipomastia, also known colloquially as fatty breasts, is a condition defined as an excess of skin and/or a flat layer of adipose tissue (that doesn't protude like female breasts) in a man's breast without true gynecomastia. It is commonly present in men with obesity, and is particularly apparent in men who have undergone massive weight loss. A related/synonymous term is pseudogynecomastia. The condition is different and should be distinguished from gynecomastia ("women's breasts"), which involves female-like protruding fat tissue and/or glandular tissue in a male. The two conditions can usually be distinguished easily by palpation to check for the presence of glandular tissue. Another difference between the conditions is that breast pain/tenderness does not occur in pseudogynecomastia. Sometimes, gynecomastia and pseudogynecomastia are present together; this is related to the fact that fat tissue expresses aromatase, the enzyme responsible for the synthesis of estrogen, and estrogen is produced to a disproportionate extent in men with excessive amounts of fat, resulting in simultaneous glandular enlargement.

== Diagnosis ==
Adipomastia can be classified as grade one, two, or three. Grade one is characterized as having minimum excess fat and skin on the chest, as well as limited change in nipple placement and inframammary fold descent. Grade 1a has no lateral excess skin roll, while grade 1b shows lateral chest skin roll. Grade two is classified as a nipple-areola complex and inframammary fold below the optimum inframammary fold, a lateral chest roll, and limited upper abdominal laxity. Grade three is described as a nipple-areola complex and inframammary fold beneath the optimum inframammary fold, lateral chest roll, and substantial upper abdominal laxity.

== Treatment ==
Ultrasonic and suction-assisted lipectomy, followed by secondary excisional procedures, can be used to treat Grade 1a Adipomastia. Ultrasonic and suction-assisted lipectomy, as well as direct excision of the lateral chest roll, are used to treat grade 1b Adipomastia. Secondary excisional procedures can be used to treat remaining deformities that do not retract properly.

Grade 2 Adipomastia may be managed with a dermoglandular pedicled reconstruction.

Grade 3 Adipomastia is treated with free-nipple grafting due to the degree of resection.
