= Breast enlargement =

Techniques to increase the size of human breasts

Breast enlargement is the enlargement of the breasts. It may occur naturally as in mammoplasia or may occur artificially through active intervention. Many women regard their breasts, which are female secondary sex characteristics, as important to their sexual attractiveness, as a sign of femininity that is important to their sense of self. Due to this, when a woman considers her breasts deficient in some respect, she might choose to engage in some activity intended to enhance them.

Actual and potential methods to achieve larger breasts include:

- Surgical breast augmentation, such as with breast implants or fat transfer.
- Pharmacological or hormonal breast enhancement, through administration of medications such as estrogen or breast enlargement supplements.
- Increasing the food energy intake by eating more and/or more energetic foods. By increasing food energy intake, more adipose tissue will be created, part of which will consist of adipose tissue located near the breast area. The amount of adipose tissue that will be added to the breasts varies from person to person and is controlled by the KLF14 gene. Additional modification of the KLF14 gene can thus make sure even more of the adipose tissue increase will occur at the breasts.
- Mechanical breast enhancement.

Ineffective methods to achieve larger breasts include:

- Mark Eden bust developer, a fraudulently marketed method and device.

== See also ==
- Breast augmentation
- Breast reduction
- Reconstructive surgery
- Penis enlargement
