= Somatomammotrophic cell =

A somatomammotroph or somatomammotrophic cell, also known as a somatolactotroph or somatolactotrophic cell, is a type of cell of the anterior pituitary gland that produces both somatotropin (growth hormone) and prolactin. Cells that secrete only somatotropin or only prolactin are known as somatotrophs and mammotrophs, respectively.

== See also ==
- Acidophil cell
- List of human cell types derived from the germ layers
