= Premenstrual water retention =

Premenstrual water retention (or premenstrual fluid retention) is the buildup of additional water or fluid in the body. This phenomenon can be seen in various forms, including increasing weight gain and swollen belly, legs, or ankles. Water retention is felt by some women of all backgrounds before their menstruation onset, and is listed as one of the most common premenstrual symptoms, in addition to cramping and back pain. Age is potentially linked to the intensity of symptoms, with the maximum symptom intensity experienced around age 35. Water retention is an element in assessing premenstrual syndrome (PMS), a set of disruptive symptoms experienced by women before menstruation. Water retention itself can cause other symptoms of PMS, such as body aches, headaches, and nausea. The duration of symptoms can vary from a few days to two weeks.

Premenstrual water retention should be carefully watched if weight is gained quickly within days. Water retention can cause serious consequences in people who have a kidney or cardiovascular disease, so these people should take extra caution when experiencing this symptom.

The cause of water retention remains unclear. It is thought to be caused by hormone changes during the menstrual cycle through high levels of circulating progesterone, estrogen, and prolactin, which stimulate secretory cells in the body, but a study found no correlation between water retention severity and serum levels of progesterone or estradiol. It is also suggested that dietary factors may play a role, such as salt and magnesium consumption, and fluid intake.

There are methods to relieve or manage water retention and related symptoms. These include both medication (such as water pills) and non-medication management (such as diet control).

== Symptoms ==
People of all ages who have periods have reported water retention symptoms days prior to their menstrual cycle. The symptoms can appear up to two weeks before the menstrual cycle (before the luteal phase) and can present as physical symptoms such as breast tenderness, weight gain, and bloating. The Penn Daily Symptom Rating Form was used in multiple studies that demonstrated these symptoms as core symptoms of the premenstrual cycle.

== Causes ==
Water retention during the premenstrual cycle can be linked to the use of conventional oral contraceptives. This is due to them containing estrogen and progestin. Synthetic progestin lacks the ability to antagonize mineralocorticoid receptors, leading to more sodium and water retention and subsequently, temporary weight gain. In addition, estrogen is known to interfere with the renin-angiotensin-aldosterone system (RAAS), since high concentrations of estrogen causes the release of more angiotensin II and aldosterone.

== Treatment ==
=== Overview ===
There are pharmacological and non-pharmacological treatment options in alleviating symptoms and providing relief during the phase of premenstrual fluid retention. Currently, pharmacological agents that are often used to treat premenstrual water retention in removing or limiting the fluid that is present. Non-pharmacological considerations to reduce the effects of the condition is focused on an individual's diet and activity levels such as exercise

=== Pharmacological ===
==== Hormonal treatments ====
Hormonal treatments such as oral contraceptives or intrauterine devices (IUDS) alters the menstrual cycle and lessen the amount of fluid retention. Within the four phases of the menstrual cycle, water retention occurs during the Luteal phase due to the production of the hormone progesterone and estrogen. The increase of these hormones results in an increase in water retention. Hormonal treatments are then used to reduce the amount of progesterone and estrogen that are produces and therefore, leading to a reduce amount of fluid.

==== Diuretics ====
In the setting of increased fluid retention, the use of Diuretics is for the removal of fluid in the body. Diuretics are known as one of the main therapies for volume overload and includes several classes whose mechanisms of actions, and pharmacokinetics are involved in the principles of nephrology. The therapy consists of drugs that pharmacologically adjusts the renal fluid regulation in favor of excreting water and electrolytes. This class of drugs works to achieve the objective of fluid removal through the increase in production and volume of urine.

==== Midol ====
A popular pharmacologic over-the-counter treatment on the market to alleviate symptoms associated with menstrual cycles in the USA is Midol. More specifically, many Midol products contain a mild diuretic in their active ingredients to help with bloating. Pamabrom helps relief premenstrual and menstrual symptoms of water retention. It is a xanthine derivative that acts as a mild, short-acting diuretic that eliminates sodium and chloride and sometimes potassium. Although the exact mechanism of how this works is still unclear, it is speculated to be due to increasing the GFR (glomerular filtration rate) and decreasing sodium reabsorption in the proximal tubule. Some Midol products also contain caffeine as a diuretic. Caffeine increases the GFR by inhibiting adenosine receptors, thus preventing vasoconstriction of the afferent arteriole in the renal system.

==== Inhibition of prostaglandins ====
Studies shows that minimizing of the use of the medication class non-steroidal anti inflammatory drugs (NSAIDs) such as Naproxen and Ibuprofen will reduce premenstrual fluid retention. NSAIDs mechanism of action consists of the inhibition of cyclooxygenase (COX) which further inhibits the production of prostaglandins and resulting in the reduction of renal water and sodium excretion in the kidneys.

=== Non-pharmacological ===
==== Magnesium supplements ====
There is ongoing research regarding the efficacy of magnesium supplement in improving premenstrual symptoms and effectively reducing water retention. They may increase fluid output which can reduce premenstrual fluid retention and alleviate symptoms.

==== Exercise ====
In several studies, it was shown that people experiencing PMS symptoms had a decrease in water retention and breast tenderness when they exercised regularly compared to those who did not.

==== Diet ====
Studies have shown a positive correlation between PMS symptoms and foods that are high in calories, fat, salt, and sugar. Instead, individuals should focus on incorporating more fruits and vegetables that are high in fiber and anti-oxidant properties to reduce PMS symptoms. Consuming smaller meals or limiting the amount of food can help minimize the occurrence of symptoms since more food consumed causes more volume in the body.

== Society and culture ==
=== Traditional Chinese medicine ===
In Traditional Chinese Medicine, PMS is seen to be caused by the qi in the liver being blocked which leads to an accumulation of blood flow in the lower half of the body. Additionally, the spleen and the stomach have an impact on water retention due to their role in digestion and nutrient breakdown. To open up the qi, people can be treated with herbs, acupuncture, diet therapy, and deep breathing exercises. PMS symptoms are also tied to changes in yin and yang that happen throughout the menstrual cycle.

Acupuncture has been traditionally used as a Chinese medical treatment for over 2000 years in Asian countries to relieve PMS symptoms. It has been speculated to work by altering blood flow, inflammatory markers, and prostaglandin levels. Especially because inflammatory markers is the main pathway in decreasing premenstrual physical symptoms such as breast tenderness and water retention. The acupoints that are most commonly used to relieve PMS symptoms due to hormone regulating properties and regulation of the nervous system include SP6, LR3, and RN4.

Qigong is another practice that consists of meditation, breathing-exercises, dance-like movements, and relaxation that has been shown to reduce PMS symptoms when compared to placebo results. Practitioners of qigong can redirect or emit their qi to heal themselves or others, helping to improve symptoms of negative feelings, water retention, etc.

Drinking green tea, which is one of the most consumed beverages, is also encouraged to reduce water retention due to its diuretic properties. Green tea contains caffeine and catechins which are anti-oxidants.

=== Middle Eastern countries ===
Many studies regarding the symptoms of PMS were based on populations in the Western or Far Eastern countries. However, the prevalence of PMS is just as dominant in Middle Eastern countries like Saudi Arabia and Palestine. These studies looked into many risk factors that could be correlated with symptom onsets but interestingly have shown that neither smoking or medical history (like chronic illnesses or medications) were related to an increase in symptoms. The frequency these symptoms were mainly associated with people who have family history of PMS symptoms and dietary habits. These studies observed the effects certain types of drinks (caffeinated) may have on the severity and frequency of symptoms but noted that the amount of fluid intake was not taken into account.

== See also ==
- Mammoplasia
