= ZNF365 =

Protein-coding gene in humans

Identifiers
- Aliases: ZNF365, Su48, UAN, ZNF365D, zinc finger protein 365
- External IDs: OMIM: 607818; MGI: 2143676; GeneCards: ZNF365

Gene location (Human)
Chr.	Chromosome 10 (human)
Band	10q21.2	Start	62,374,192 bp
Band	10q21.2	End	62,480,288 bp

Gene location (Mouse)
Chr.	Chromosome 10 (mouse)
Band	10|10 B5.1	Start	67,721,933 bp
Band	10|10 B5.1	End	67,748,492 bp
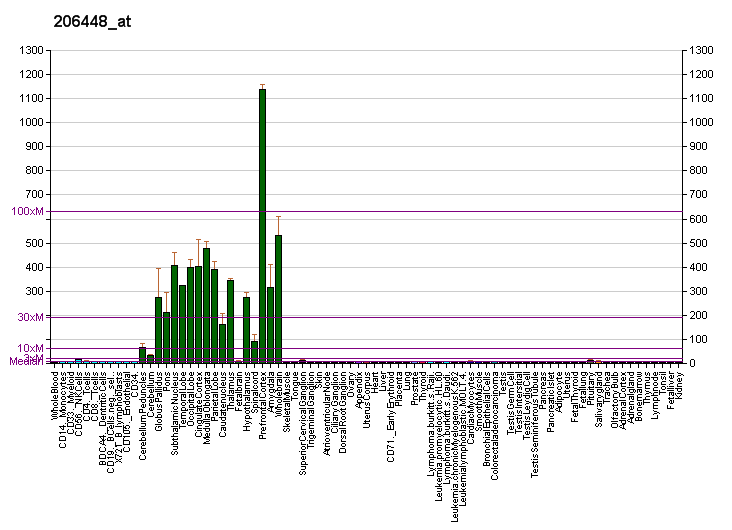
RNA expression pattern
Bgee	Human / Mouse (ortholog); Top expressed in: middle temporal gyrus; lateral nuclear group of thalamus; Brodmann area 23; postcentral gyrus; superior frontal gyrus; Brodmann area 46; Brodmann area 10; orbitofrontal cortex; frontal pole; occipital lobe / Top expressed in: piriform cortex; Region I of hippocampus proper; prefrontal cortex; primary motor cortex; olfactory tubercle; subiculum; amygdala; visual cortex; superior frontal gyrus; primary visual cortex; More reference expression data
BioGPS	More reference expression data
Gene ontology
Molecular function	protein homodimerization activity; protein binding; identical protein binding; metal ion binding
Cellular component	gamma-tubulin complex; centrosome; cytoplasm; cytoskeleton; microtubule organizing center; intracellular membrane-bounded organelle
Biological process	gamma-tubulin complex localization; mitotic cytokinesis; telomere maintenance; regulation of double-strand break repair via homologous recombination; negative regulation of neuron projection development; cerebellar molecular layer morphogenesis; positive regulation of oligodendrocyte differentiation; dendritic spine morphogenesis; regulation of DNA strand resection involved in replication fork processing; dendrite arborization; nervous system development
Sources:Amigo / QuickGO
Orthologs
Databases	NCBI: entry; OMA: entry
Species	Human	Mouse
Entrez	22891	216049
Ensembl	ENSG00000138311	ENSMUSG00000037855
UniProt	Q70YC4; Q70YC5	Q8BG89
RefSeq (mRNA)	NM_014951; NM_199450; NM_199451; NM_199452	NM_178679
RefSeq (protein)	NP_055766; NP_955522; NP_955523; NP_055766.2; NP_955522.1 NP_955523.1	NP_848794
Location (UCSC)	Chr 10: 62.37 – 62.48 Mb	Chr 10: 67.72 – 67.75 Mb
PubMed search
- Wikidata
View/Edit Human	View/Edit Mouse

Talanin is a protein that in humans is encoded by the ZNF365 gene. More narrowly, Talanin can refer to isoform 4, which appears to be an isoform unique to primates. This protein may be involved in uric acid excretion.
