= Breast enlargement supplement =

Herbal supplements claiming, without evidence, to enlarge breasts

Breast enlargement supplements are frequently portrayed as being a natural means to increase breast size, and with the suggestion that they are free from risk. The popularity of breast enlargement supplements stems from their heavy promotion toward women. Though there has been historical folklore about using herbs for breast enlargement, there is no scientific evidence to support the effectiveness of any breast enlargement supplement. At times, testimonials by companies have been faked.

In the United States, both the Federal Trade Commission and the Food and Drug Administration have taken action against the manufacturers of these products for fraudulent practices. The Mayo Clinic advises that there may be serious drug interactions with their use.

== Types and ingredients ==
Products typically contain a variety of ingredients of plant or fungal origin. The compounds claimed to be pharmacologically active are typically estrogen mimics (called xenoestrogens; specifically known as phytoestrogens in plants and mycoestrogens in fungi).

Commonly used ingredients include:

- Barley
- Black cohosh
- Dong quai
- Fennel
- Fenugreek
- Hops
- Kava
- Oats
- Pueraria mirifica
- Zearalenone

== Efficacy and safety ==
There is inadequate scientific study whether herbal breast enlargement can be safely achieved. It is unlikely that any of the common ingredients would be efficacious. No randomized, blinded and fully controlled tests has been performed to test any breast enhancement product. Most supplement ingredients do not have significant adverse effects, but some ingredients are potentially dangerous for consumption or use.

In the United States, herbal products are normally sold under "generally recognized as safe" (GRAS) rules and are not approved for any indication.

Some naturally occurring compounds produced by plants and fungi can carry serious health risks.

- One potential risk is an increased chance of breast cancer.
- Some of the ingredients included in supplements are carcinogenic, including don quai.
- By altering the body's hormonal levels, certain ingredients, including zearalenone, may reduce fertility.
- One ingredient, kava, may cause liver damage.
- Black cohosh has been shown to have no estrogenic effect in vivo or in vitro.
- Hops contains estrogen-like compounds, called prenylflavonoids, the most potent of which is 8-prenylnaringenin. Hops' effect on fertility lacks research. Prenylflavonoids from hops have anticancer properties.
- Zearalenone and its derivatives are a class of xenoestrogens associated with many herbal bust enhancement products. There have been some claims that zearalenone can increase the size of breasts in humans, but there are no tests of efficacy or safety. Zearalenone, produced by a toxic fungus, is a mycoestrogen that stimulates the growth of breast cancer cells, increases the chance of estrogen dependent breast cancer, and may reduce fertility. Other supplements are unlikely to have been spoiled with the mould.

Indirect assay tests of the product Erdic (also known as Bust out) on the uterus of rodents, by measuring the amount of estrogen present, showed no difference from the control. Preliminary findings in 2001, in mice, suggested that hops-based products would be ineffective. Another test, of a hops ingredient on mice showed weak effects for high dosages. Diosgenin, which is present in fenugreek and wild yam, affected maturation, but that wasn't enough evidence for this indication.

Some medications have been involved in breast enlargement as a side effect.

== See also ==
- Mark Eden bust developer
- Breast implant
