= Thioacetazone =

Chemical compound

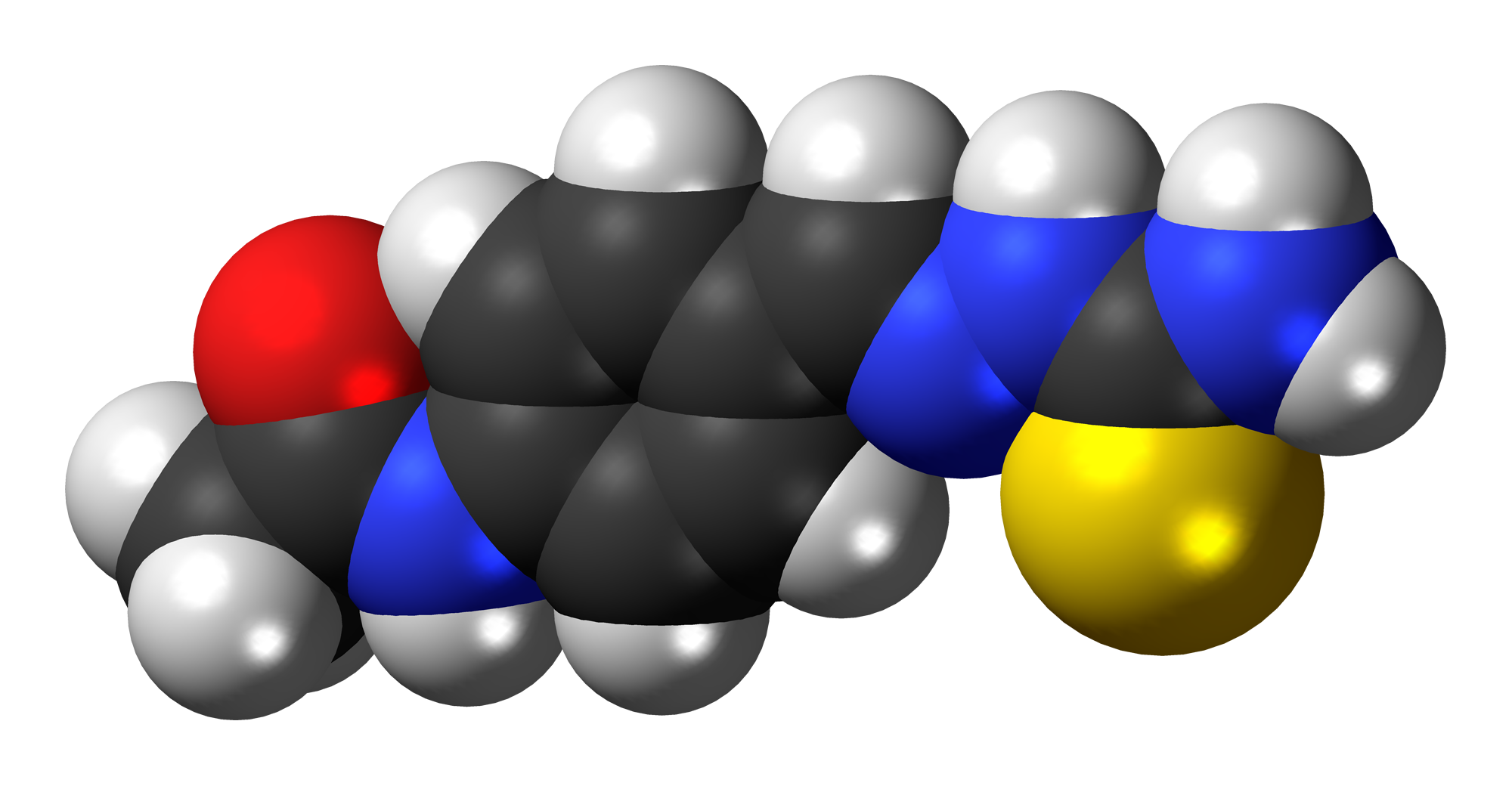

Clinical data
- Trade names: Conteben
- Other names: Thiacetazone; Thiocetazone; Thioparamizone; Benzothiozane; 4-Acetylaminobenzaldehyde thiosemicarbazone; N-[4-[(Carbamothioylhydrazinylidene) methyl]phenyl]acetamide
- AHFS/Drugs.com: International Drug Names
- Routes of administration: Oral
- ATC code: J04AM04 (WHO)

Identifiers
- IUPAC name: N-{4-[(Ethanethioamidoimino)methyl]phenyl}acetamide
- CAS Number: 104-06-3
- PubChem CID: 9568512
- ChemSpider: 7843221
- UNII: MMG78X7SSR
- KEGG: D08584
- ChEMBL: ChEMBL375492
- CompTox Dashboard (EPA): DTXSID80859179 DTXSID2022593, DTXSID80859179
- ECHA InfoCard: 100.002.882

Chemical and physical data
- Formula: C_{10}H_{12}N_{4}OS
- Molar mass: 236.29 g·mol^{−1}
- 3D model (JSmol): Interactive image
- SMILES: O=C(Nc1ccc(cc1)\C=N\NC(=S)N)C
- InChI: InChI=1S/C10H12N4OS/c1-7(15)13-9-4-2-8(3-5-9)6-12-14-10(11)16/h2-6H,1H3,(H,13,15)(H3,11,14,16)/b12-6+; Key:SRVJKTDHMYAMHA-WUXMJOGZSA-N

Thioacetazone (INN, BAN), also known as amithiozone (USAN), is an oral antibiotic which is used in the treatment of tuberculosis. It has fallen into almost complete disuse due to toxicity and the introduction of improved anti-tuberculosis drugs like isoniazid. The drug has only weak activity against Mycobacterium tuberculosis and is only useful in preventing resistance to more powerful drugs such as isoniazid and rifampicin. It is never used on its own to treat tuberculosis; it is used in a similar way to ethambutol.

There is no advantage to using thioacetazone if the regimen used already contains ethambutol, but many countries in sub-Saharan Africa still use thioacetazone because it is extremely cheap. Use of thioacetazone is declining because it can cause severe (sometimes fatal) skin reactions in HIV positive patients.

The biological target of thioacetazone has proven elusive and its mechanism of action remains unknown, although it is thought to interfere with mycolic acid synthesis.

== Adverse effects ==
One of the documented adverse effects of thioacetazone is the excessive accumulation of serum (or blood plasma) in the brain. Another is weakening of the thyroid glands. These were found in a treatment combining conteben with PAS acid p-amino-salicylic acid.

== See also ==
- Thiosemicarbazide
