= Micromastia =

Abnormally underdeveloped breasts

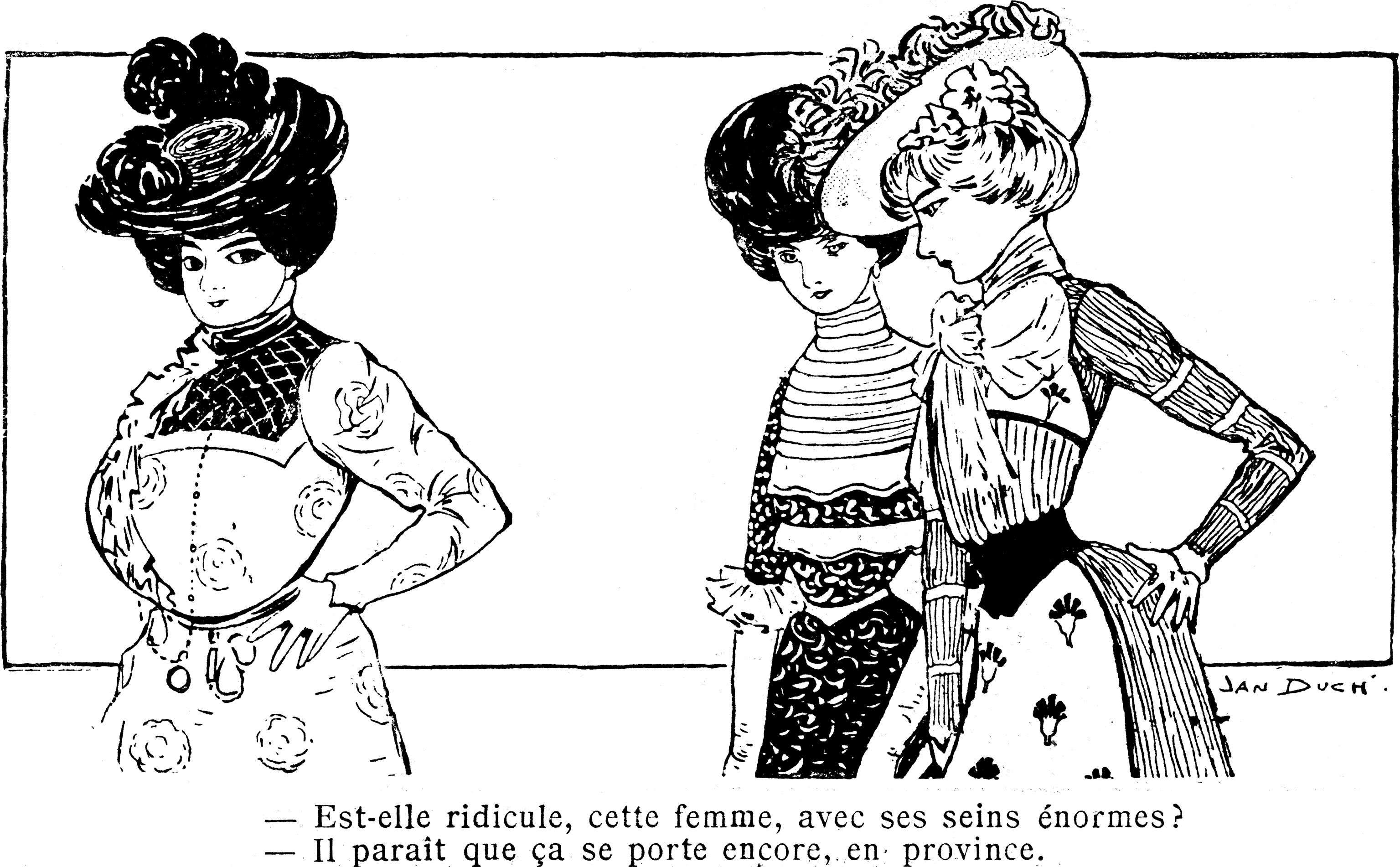
- Some societies idealize underdeveloped breasts, such as early-twentieth-century France. In this 1900 French cartoon, two small-breasted women criticize a large-breasted woman for not conforming to this fashion.
- Specialty: Medical genetics

Micromastia (also called hypomastia, breast aplasia, breast hypoplasia, or mammary hypoplasia) is a medical term describing the postpubertal underdevelopment of a woman's breast tissue. Just as it is impossible to define 'normal' breast size, there is no objective definition of micromastia. Breast development is commonly asymmetric and one or both breasts may be small. This condition may be a congenital defect associated with underlying abnormalities of the pectoral muscle (as in Poland's syndrome), related to trauma (typically surgery or radiotherapy) or it may be a more subjective aesthetic description.

Self-perceived micromastia involves a discrepancy between a person's body image, and their internalized images of appropriate or desirable breast size and shape. Societal ideals over breast size vary over time, but there exist many conceived ideas involving breasts and sexual attractiveness and identity across different cultures.

== Causes ==
Micromastia can be a congenital or acquired disorder and may be unilateral or bilateral. Congenital causes include ulnar–mammary syndrome (caused by mutations in the TBX3 gene), Poland syndrome, Turner syndrome, and congenital adrenal hyperplasia. There is also a case report of familial hypoplasia of the nipples and athelia associated with mammary hypoplasia that was described in a father and his daughters. Acquired causes of micromastia include irradiation in infancy and childhood and surgical removal of prepubertal breast bud.

== Treatment ==
The procedure to remedy micromastia is breast enlargement, most commonly augmentation mammoplasty using breast implants. Other techniques available involve using muscle flap-based reconstructive surgery techniques (latissimus dorsi and rectus abdominis muscles), microsurgical reconstruction, or fat grafting.

Another potential treatment is hormonal breast enhancement, such as with estrogens.

== See also ==
- Amastia – Absence of the breast and nipple
- Amazia – Absence of the mammary gland
- Breast atrophy – Shrinkage of the breasts
- Breast reconstruction – Surgical rebuilding of a breast
- Tuberous breasts
