= Gynecomastia =

Enlargement of the human male breast

- Adult male with significant gynecomastia
- Pronunciation: /ˌɡaɪnɪkoʊˈmæstiə, ˌdʒaɪ-, -kə-/ or /ɡaɪˈniːkəmæstiə, -koʊ-/
- Specialty: Endocrinology, plastic surgery
- Complications: Psychological distress
- Usual onset: Any age, but common in puberty
- Duration: Usually up to 2 years, but can be lifelong
- Causes: Increased estrogen/androgen ratio (physiologic, medications, chronic kidney disease, obesity, cirrhosis, malnutrition, certain cancers, anabolic steroids), Klinefelter Syndrome
- Diagnostic method: physical exam, mammography (if indicated)
- Differential diagnosis: Pseudogynecomastia, breast cancer
- Treatment: Lifestyle modifications, aromatase inhibitors, SERMs, or surgery
- Frequency: ~35% of men, up to 70% of adolescent boys

Gynecomastia (also spelled gynaecomastia) (Note: The term comes from the Greek γυνή gyné (stem gynaik-) meaning "female" and μαστός mastós meaning "breast".) is the non-cancerous enlargement of one or both breasts in men due to the growth of breast tissue as a result of a hormone imbalance between estrogens and androgens. Physically speaking, gynecomastia is completely benign, but it is associated with significant psychological distress, social stigma, and dysphoria.

Gynecomastia can be normal in newborn male babies due to exposure to estrogen from the mother, in adolescent boys going through puberty, in older men over the age of 50, and in obese men. Most occurrences of gynecomastia do not require diagnostic tests. Abnormal hormone changes that cause gynecomastia may be caused by any condition that leads to an increase in the ratio of estrogens/androgens such as liver disease, kidney failure, thyroid disease and some non-breast tumors. Alcohol and some drugs can also cause breast enlargement. Other causes may include Klinefelter syndrome, metabolic dysfunction, or a natural decline in testosterone production. This may occur even if the levels of estrogens and androgens are both appropriate, but the ratio is altered.

Gynecomastia is the most common benign disorder of the male breast tissue and affects 35% of men, being most prevalent between the ages of 50 and 69. It is normal for up to 70% of adolescent boys to develop gynecomastia to some degree. Of these, 75% resolve within two years of onset without treatment. If the condition does not resolve within 2 years, or if it causes embarrassment, pain or tenderness, treatment is warranted. Medical treatment of gynecomastia that has persisted beyond two years is often ineffective. Gynecomastia is different from "pseudogynecomastia", which is commonly present in men with obesity.

Medications such as aromatase inhibitors are effective, even in rare cases of gynecomastia from disorders such as aromatase excess syndrome or Peutz–Jeghers syndrome, but surgical removal of the excess tissue can be needed to achieve a desired chest contour. In 2019, 24,123 male patients underwent the procedure in the United States, accounting for a 19% increase since 2000.

== Definition ==
Gynecomastia is the abnormal non-cancerous enlargement of one or both breasts in men due to the growth of breast tissue as a result of a hormone imbalance between estrogen and androgen. Gynecomastia is different from "pseudogynecomastia", which is defined as an excess of skin and/or adipose tissue in the male breasts without the growth of true glandular breast tissue; this is commonly associated with obesity and can be ruled out by physical exam.

== Signs and symptoms ==
In gynecomastia, there is always enlargement of one or both breasts, symmetrically or asymmetrically, in a man. A soft, compressible, and mobile mass of breast tissue is felt under the nipple and its surrounding skin in contrast to softer fatty tissue, which is not associated with a mass. It may also be accompanied by breast tenderness or nipple sensitivity, which is commonly associated with gynecomastia observed in adolescents, typically early in development. Gynecomastia that is painful, bothersome, rapidly-growing, associated with masses in other areas of the body, or persistent should be evaluated by a clinician for potential causes. Dimpling of the skin, nipple discharge, and nipple retraction are not typical features of gynecomastia and may be associated with other disorders. Milky discharge from the nipple is not a typical finding, but may be seen in a gynecomastic individual with a prolactin secreting tumor. An increase in the diameter of the areola and asymmetry of the chest are other possible signs of gynecomastia.

Much of the research on gynecomastia has focused on its causes and treatment, but little has explored its effects on mental health and overall quality of life. Gynecomastia has psychosocial implications that may be particularly challenging for adolescents who are experiencing physical maturation and self-identity formation, which includes body image disturbances, negative attitudes towards eating, self-esteem problems, social withdrawal, anxiety, and shame. Men with gynecomastia may appear anxious or stressed due to concerns about its appearance and the possibility of having breast cancer. Particular studies suggest that gynecomastia can lead to various psychological and social challenges, such as depression, anxiety and disordered eating.

== Causes ==
Gynecomastia is thought to be caused by an altered ratio of estrogens to androgens mediated by an increase in estrogen action, a decrease in androgen action, or a combination of these two factors. Estrogen and androgens have opposing actions on breast tissue: estrogens stimulate proliferation while androgens inhibit proliferation. The cause of gynecomastia is unknown in around 25% of cases. Known causes can be physiologic (occurring normally) or non-physiologic due to underlying pathologies such as drug use, chronic disease, tumors, or malnutrition.

=== Physiologic ===
Physiologic or normal gynecomastia can occur at three timepoints in life: shortly after birth in both female and male infants, during puberty in adolescent males, and in older adults over the age of 60.

==== Newborns ====
60–90% of male and female newborns may show breast development at birth or in the first weeks of life. During pregnancy, the placenta converts the androgenic hormones dehydroepiandrosterone (DHEA) and DHEA sulfate to the estrogenic hormones estrone and estradiol, respectively; after the placenta produces these estrogens, they are transferred into the baby's circulation, thereby leading to temporary gynecomastia in the baby. In some infants, neonatal milk (also known as "witch's milk") can leak from the nipples. The temporary gynecomastia seen in newborn babies usually resolves after two or three weeks.

==== Adolescents ====
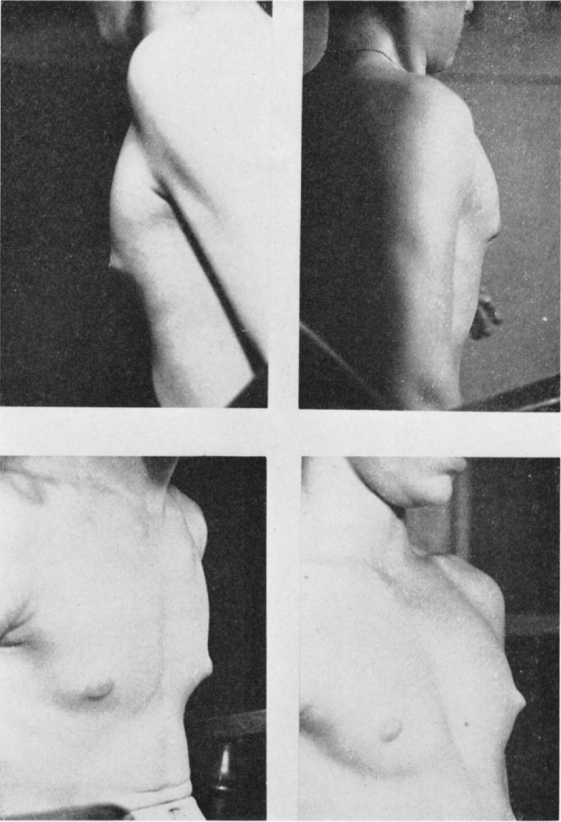
Gynecomastia of boys going through puberty

Hormonal imbalance (elevated ratio of estrogen to androgen) during early puberty, either due to decreased androgen production from the adrenals and/or increased conversion of androgens to estrogens, leads to transient gynecomastia in adolescent males. It can occur in up to 65% of adolescents as early as age 10 and peaks at ages 13 and 14. It is self-limited in 75–90% of adolescents. Usually, it resolves spontaneously within 1 to 3 years as pubertal progression increases testosterone levels and causes regression of breast tissue. By age 17, only 10% of adolescent males have persistent gynecomastia.

==== Older adults ====
Declining testosterone levels and an increase in the level of subcutaneous fatty tissue seen as part of the normal aging process can lead to gynecomastia in older males. Increased fatty tissue, a major site of aromatase activity, leads to increased conversion of androgenic hormones such as testosterone into estrogens. Additionally, levels of sex hormone binding globulin (SHBG) increase with age and bind with less affinity to estrogen than androgens. Put together, the elevated ratio of estrogen to androgen leads to gynecomastia, also known as senile gynecomastia in this group. There is a 24–65% prevalence of senile gynecomastia in older males.

=== Non-physiologic ===
==== Drugs ====
An exceptional case of extreme gynecomastia in a 63-year-old man, treated with the nonsteroidal antiandrogen flutamide for prostate cancer. (a) With flutamide, (b) after discontinuation of flutamide. More than 90% of cases of gynecomastia with nonsteroidal antiandrogens including flutamide are mild to moderate.

About 10–25% of gynecomastia cases are estimated to result from the use of medications or exogenous chemicals. Drugs can increase estrogen activity or increase the estrogen to androgen ratio through various mechanisms, such as binding to estrogen receptors, promoting estrogen synthesis, providing precursors that can be aromatized into estrogen, causing damage to the testes, inhibiting testosterone synthesis, inhibiting the action of androgens, or displacing estrogen from SHBG. Drugs with good evidence for association with gynecomastia include cimetidine, ketoconazole, gonadotropin-releasing hormone analogues, human growth hormone, human chorionic gonadotropin, 5α-reductase inhibitors such as finasteride and dutasteride, certain estrogens used for prostate cancer, and antiandrogens such as bicalutamide, flutamide, and spironolactone.

Drugs with fair evidence for association with gynecomastia include calcium channel blockers such as verapamil, amlodipine, and nifedipine; risperidone, olanzapine, anabolic steroids, alcohol, opioids, efavirenz, alkylating agents, and omeprazole. Certain components of personal skin care products such as lavender or tea tree oil have been reported to cause prepubertal gynecomastia due to its estrogenic and anti-androgenic effects. Certain dietary supplements such as dong quai and Tribulus terrestris have also been associated with gynecomastia.

==== Refeeding gynecomastia ====
Malnutrition and significant loss of body fat suppress gonadotropin secretion, leading to hypogonadism. This is reversible when adequate nutrition resumes, where the return of gonadotropin secretion and gonadal function causes a transient imbalance of estrogen and androgen that mimics puberty, resulting in transient gynecomastia. This phenomenon, also known as refeeding gynecomastia, was first observed when men returning home from prison camps during World War II developed gynecomastia after resuming a normal diet. Similar to pubertal gynecomastia, refeeding gynecomastia resolves on its own in 1–2 years.

==== Chronic disease ====
Many kidney failure patients experience a hormonal imbalance due to the suppression of testosterone production and testicular damage from high levels of urea also known as uremia-associated hypogonadism. Additionally, gynecomastia has been observed in 50% of patients with chronic kidney disease undergoing dialysis. Similar to the mechanism behind refeeding gynecomastia, dialysis allows patients with renal failure who were previously malnourished to expand their diets and regain weight. Dialysis-associated gynecomastia resolves spontaneously within 1–2 years.

In individuals with liver failure or cirrhosis, the liver's ability to properly metabolize hormones such as estrogen may be impaired. Additionally, those with alcoholic liver disease are further put at risk for the development of gynecomastia; ethanol may directly disrupt the synthesis of testosterone, and the presence of phytoestrogens in alcoholic drinks may also contribute to a higher estrogen to testosterone ratio. Conditions that can cause malabsorption such as cystic fibrosis or ulcerative colitis may also produce gynecomastia.

A small proportion of male gynecomastia cases may be seen with rare inherited disorders such as spinal and bulbar muscular atrophy and the very rare aromatase excess syndrome.

==== Hypogonadism ====
An absolute deficiency in androgen production due to primary or secondary hypogonadism can cause gynecomastia. Primary hypogonadism results when there is damage to the testes (due to radiation, chemotherapy, infections, trauma, etc.), leading to impaired androgen production. It can also be caused by chromosomal abnormality seen in Klinefelter syndrome, which is associated with gynecomastia in about 80% of cases. Secondary hypogonadism results when there is damage to the hypothalamus or pituitary (due to radiation, chemotherapy, infection, trauma, etc.), and similarly leads to impaired androgen production. The net effect is reduced androgen production while serum estrogen levels (from peripheral aromatization of androgens) remain unaffected. The lack of androgen-mediated inhibition of breast tissue proliferation, combined with relative estrogen excess, results in gynecomastia.

==== Tumors ====
Testicular tumors such as Leydig cell tumors, Sertoli cell tumors (such as in Peutz–Jeghers syndrome) and hCG-secreting choriocarcinoma may result in rapid-onset gynecomastia by causing excess production of estrogen. Other tumors such as adrenal tumors, pituitary gland tumors (such as a prolactinoma), or lung cancer, can produce hormones that alter the male–female hormone balance and cause gynecomastia.

Individuals with prostate cancer who are treated with androgen deprivation therapy may experience gynecomastia.

== Pathophysiology ==
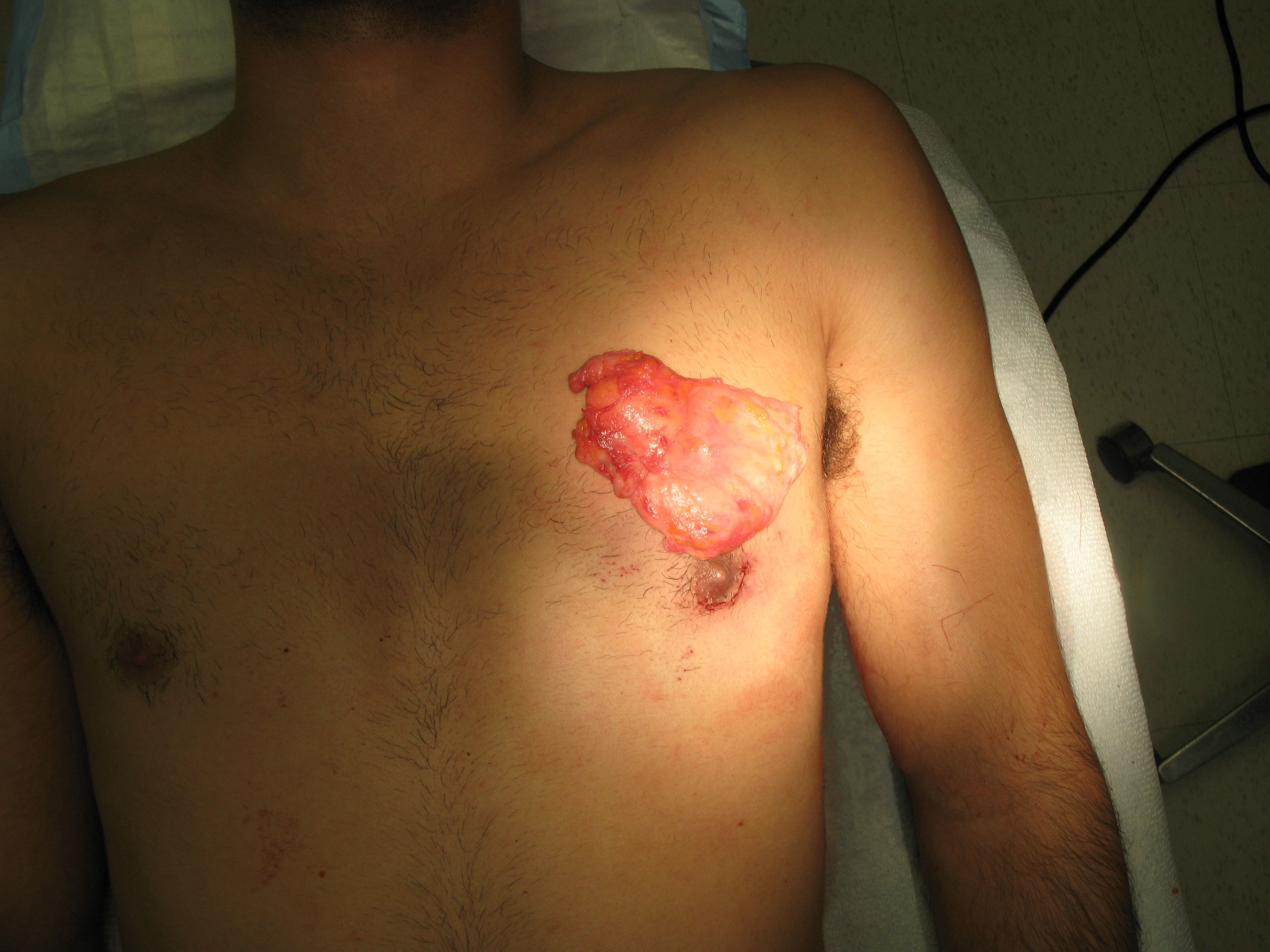
Pathology: A large glandular mass of male breast tissue, surgically removed

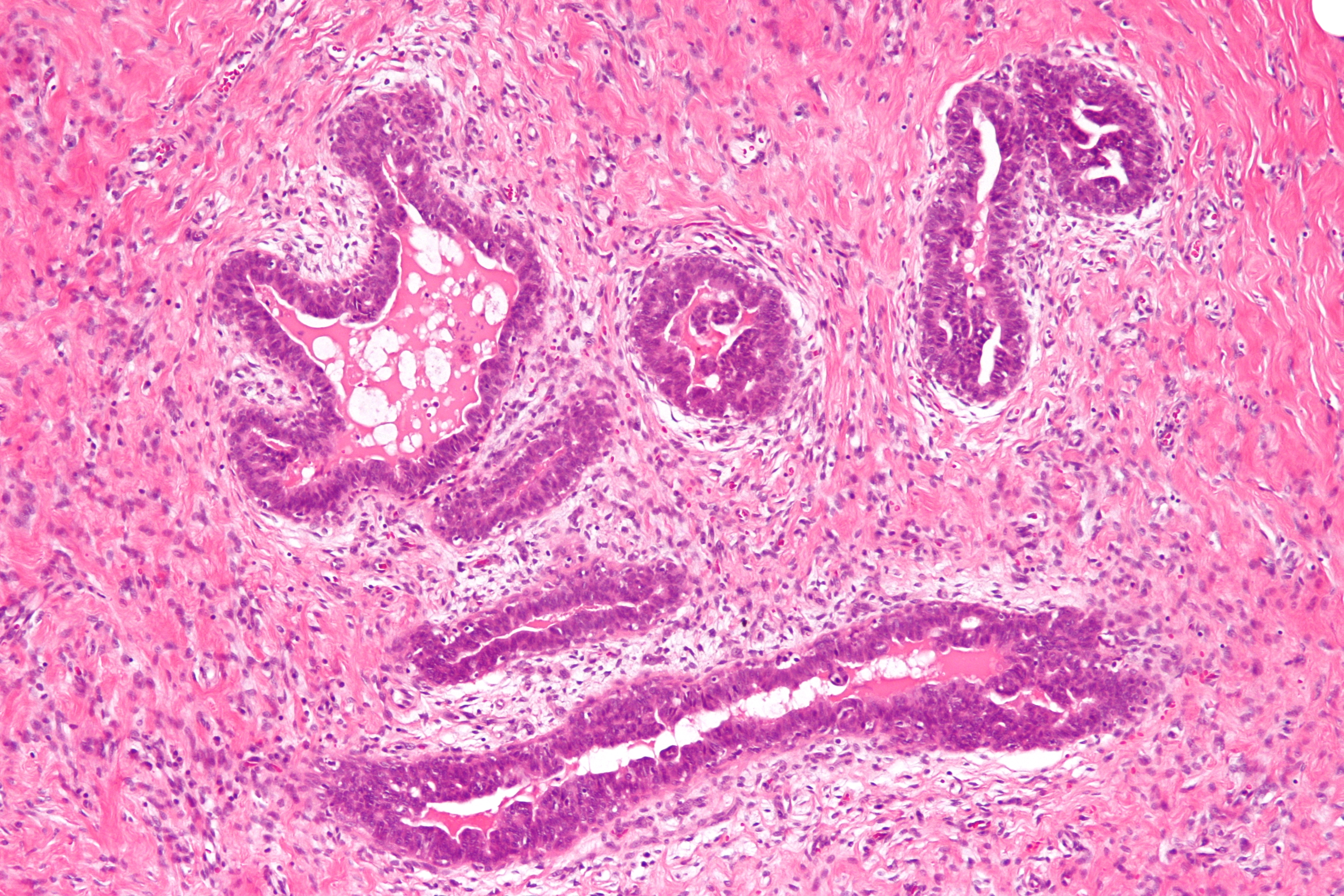
Microscopic image showing gynecomastoid hyperplasia, the cellular changes seen in gynecomastia H&E stain

The causes of common gynecomastia remain uncertain, but are thought to result from an imbalance between the actions of estrogen, which stimulates breast tissue growth, and androgens, which inhibit breast tissue growth. Breast prominence can result from enlargement of glandular breast tissue, chest adipose tissue (fat), and skin, and is typically a combination. As in females, estrogen stimulates the growth of breast tissue in males. In addition to directly stimulating breast tissue growth, estrogens indirectly decrease secretion of testosterone by suppressing luteinizing hormone secretion, resulting in decreased testicular secretion of testosterone.

=== Estrogen excess ===
One of the main mechanisms for imbalance between estrogens and androgens is the overproduction of estrogens. A possible cause may be a neoplasm that originates from estrogen-secreting cells. Tumors that produce hCG stimulate production of estradiol while reducing other testicular hormone production. Obesity is another common cause of excess serum estrogens due to the presence of aromatase in peripheral tissue, which is a protein that converts androgens into estrogens. Peutz-Jeghers syndrome is a rare cause of testicular tumors that affect aromatase expression, which results in elevated serum estrogen levels. Aromatase excess syndrome is a rare genetic disorder that leads to increased conversion of androgens to estrogens in the body.

=== Androgen deficiency ===
Primary hypogonadism (indicating an intrinsic problem with the testes in males) leads to decreased testosterone synthesis and increased conversion of testosterone to estradiol, potentially leading to a gynecomastic appearance. Klinefelter syndrome is a notable example of a disorder that causes hypogonadism and gynecomastia, and has a higher risk of breast cancer in males (20–50 times higher than males without the disorder). Secondary hypogonadism (indicating a problem with the brain) leads to decreased production and release of luteinizing hormone (LH, a stimulatory signal for endogenous steroid hormone synthesis) which leads to decreased production of testosterone and estradiol in the testes.

=== Increased levels of sex hormone-binding globulin ===
Estrogens can increase blood levels of the protein sex hormone-binding globulin (SHBG), which binds free testosterone (the active form) more strongly than estrogen, leading to decreased testosterone action in male breast tissue. Conditions such as hyperthyroidism and chronic liver disease affect levels of SHBG, leading to symptomatic gynecomastia.

=== Androgen resistance ===
Dysfunction in the androgen receptor prevents testosterone from acting on its target tissues. Androgen insensitivity syndromes result from the different degrees of resistance to the effects of androgens, and can cause external genitalia that may not be aligned with the genotype of the individual's sex chromosomes. Complete androgen insensitivity syndrome results in the failure to develop external genitalia such as the penis and scrotum along with the development of breasts in an individual with testes. Partial androgen insensitivity syndrome may result in a variety of presentations. Minimal androgen insensitivity syndrome may present as gynecomastia in adolescence and may additionally be associated with infertility.

=== Medications ===
Medications are known to cause gynecomastia through several different mechanisms. These mechanisms include increasing estrogen levels, mimicking estrogen, decreasing testosterone or other androgen levels, blocking androgen receptors, increasing prolactin levels, or through unidentified means. Potential causative agents include oral contraceptive pills, spironolactone, and anabolic steroids.

High levels of prolactin in the blood (which may occur as a result of certain tumors or as a side effect of certain medications) has been associated with gynecomastia. A high level of prolactin in the blood can inhibit the release of gonadotropin-releasing hormone and therefore cause secondary hypogonadism. Receptors for prolactin and other hormones including insulin-like growth factor 1, insulin-like growth factor 2, luteinizing hormone, progesterone, and human chorionic gonadotropin have been found in male breast tissue; the impact of these various hormones on gynecomastia development is not well understood.

=== Chronic disease ===
Individuals who have cirrhosis or chronic liver disease may develop gynecomastia for several reasons. Those diagnosed with cirrhosis tend to have increased secretion of the androgenic hormone androstenedione from the adrenal glands, increased conversion of this hormone into various types of estrogen, and increased levels of SHBG, which leads to decreased blood levels of free testosterone. Around 10–40% of males with Graves' disease (a common form of hyperthyroidism) experience gynecomastia. Increased conversion of testosterone to estrogen by increased aromatase activity, increased levels of SHBG and increased production of testosterone and estradiol by the testes due to elevated levels of LH cause the gynecomastia. Proper treatment of the hyperthyroidism can lead to the resolution of the gynecomastia.

Estrogen excess	Androgen deficiency	Increased levels of sex hormone-binding globulin	Androgen resistance	Medications
Tumors (Testicular, Choriocarcinoma, Adrenal, Pituitary gland, Lung); Peutz-Jeghers syndrome; Aromatase excess syndrome; Obesity; Aging	Primary hypogonadism (Klinefelter's syndrome); Secondary hypogonadism	Hyperthyroidism (Grave's disease); Cirrhosis	Androgen insensitivity syndromes	Oral contraceptives; Calcium channel blockers; Cimetidine; Ketoconazole; Gonadotropin-releasing hormone analogues; Human growth hormone; Human chorionic gonadotropin; 5α-reductase inhibitors; Antiantrogens

== Diagnosis ==
To diagnose gynecomastia, a thorough history and physical examination are obtained by a physician. Important aspects of the physical examination include evaluation of the male breast tissue with palpation to evaluate for breast cancer and pseudogynecomastia (male breast tissue enlargement solely due to excess fatty tissue), evaluation of penile size and development, evaluation of testicular development and an assessment for masses that raise suspicion for testicular cancer, and proper development of secondary sex characteristics such as the amount and distribution of pubic and underarm hair. Gynecomastia usually presents with bilateral involvement of the breast tissue but may occur unilaterally as well.

Diagnosis of men with breast enlargement can be evaluated using an algorithm. A review of the medications or substances an individual takes may reveal the cause of gynecomastia. Recommended laboratory investigations to find the underlying cause of gynecomastia include tests for aspartate transaminase and alanine transaminase to rule out liver disease, serum creatinine to determine if kidney damage is present, and thyroid-stimulating hormone levels to evaluate for hyperthyroidism. If these initial laboratory tests fail to uncover the cause of gynecomastia, then additional tests to evaluate for an underlying hormonal balance due to hypogonadism or a testicular tumor should be checked including total and free levels of testosterone, luteinizing hormone, follicle stimulating hormone, estradiol, serum beta human chorionic gonadotropin (β-hCG), and prolactin.

High levels of prolactin are uncommon in people with gynecomastia. If β-hCG levels are abnormally high, then ultrasound of the testicles should be performed to check for signs of a hormone-secreting testicular tumor. Markers of testicular, adrenal, or other tumors, such as urinary 17-ketosteroid or serum dehydroepiandrosterone, may also be checked if there is evidence of hormonal imbalance on physical examination. If this evaluation does not reveal the cause of gynecomastia, it is considered to be idiopathic gynecomastia (of unclear cause).

=== Differential diagnosis ===
While there can be many potential causes of male patients that present with increased breast tissue, differential diagnoses are most concerning for gynecomastia, pseudogynecomastia, and breast cancer (which is rare in men). Other potential causes of male breast enlargement such as mastitis, lipoma, sebaceous cyst, dermoid cyst, hematoma, metastasis, ductal ectasia, fat necrosis, or a hamartoma are typically excluded before making the diagnosis.

=== Imaging ===
Mammography is the method of choice for radiologic examination of male breast tissue in the diagnosis of gynecomastia when breast cancer is suspected on physical examination. If a mass/lump is felt during a physical exam, some features of the lump that would point to malignancy would be painless, non-movable (fixed), irregularly shaped, and skin changes. Mammography is rarely indicated for men since breast cancer is an unlikely diagnosis. If mammography is performed and does not reveal findings suggestive of breast cancer, further imaging is not typically necessary. If a tumor of the adrenal glands or the testes is thought to be responsible for the gynecomastia, ultrasound examination of these structures may be performed.

=== Histology ===
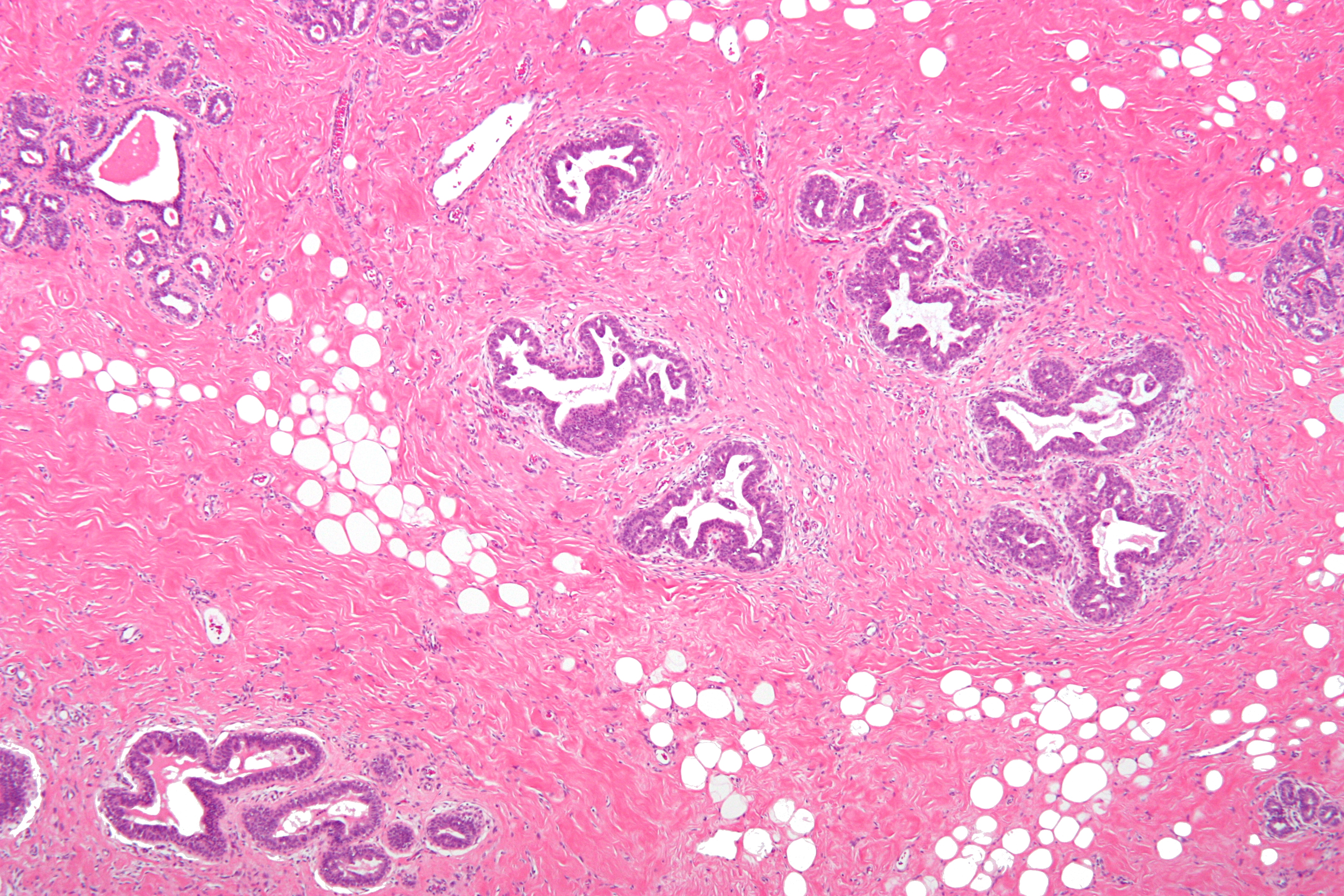
Gynecomastoid hyperplasia - Low magnification

Early histological features expected to be seen on examination of gynecomastic tissue attained by fine-needle aspiration biopsy include the following: proliferation and lengthening of the ducts; an increase in connective tissue; an increase in inflammation; and swelling surrounding the ducts; and an increase in fibroblasts in the connective tissue. Chronic gynecomastia may show different histological features such as increased connective tissue fibrosis, an increase in the number of ducts, less inflammation than in the acute stage of gynecomastia, increased subareolar fat, and hyalinization of the stroma. When surgery is performed, the gland is routinely sent to the lab to confirm the presence of gynecomastia and to check for tumors under a microscope. The utility of pathologic examination of breast tissue removed from male adolescent gynecomastia patients has recently been questioned due to the rarity of breast cancer in this population.

=== Classification ===
The spectrum of gynecomastia severity has been categorized into a grading system:

- Grade I: Minor enlargement, no skin excess
- Grade II: Moderate enlargement, no skin excess
- Grade III: Moderate enlargement, skin excess
- Grade IV: Marked enlargement, skin excess

== Treatment ==
If gynecomastia does not resolve on its own within two years, then medical treatment is necessary. The options are medication or surgical intervention.

=== Medication ===
Gynecomastia can respond well to medical treatment, although it is usually effective only when done within the first two years after the start of male breast enlargement. Selective estrogen receptor modulators (SERMs) such as tamoxifen, raloxifene, and clomifene may be beneficial in the treatment of gynecomastia but are not approved by the Food and Drug Administration for use in gynecomastia. Clomifene seems to be less effective than tamoxifen or raloxifene. Tamoxifen may be used to treat gynecomastia in adults, and of the medical treatments used, tamoxifen is the most effective. Recent studies have shown that treatment with tamoxifen may represent a safe and effective mode of treatment in cases of cosmetically disturbing or painful gynecomastia. Aromatase inhibitors (AIs) such as anastrozole have been used off-label for cases of gynecomastia occurring during puberty but are less effective than SERMs.

A few cases of gynecomastia caused by the rare disorders aromatase excess syndrome and Peutz–Jeghers syndrome have responded to treatment with AIs such as anastrozole. Androgens/anabolic steroids may be effective for gynecomastia. Testosterone itself may not be suitable to treat gynecomastia as it can be aromatized into estradiol, but nonaromatizable androgens like topical androstanolone (dihydrotestosterone) can be useful.

=== Surgery ===
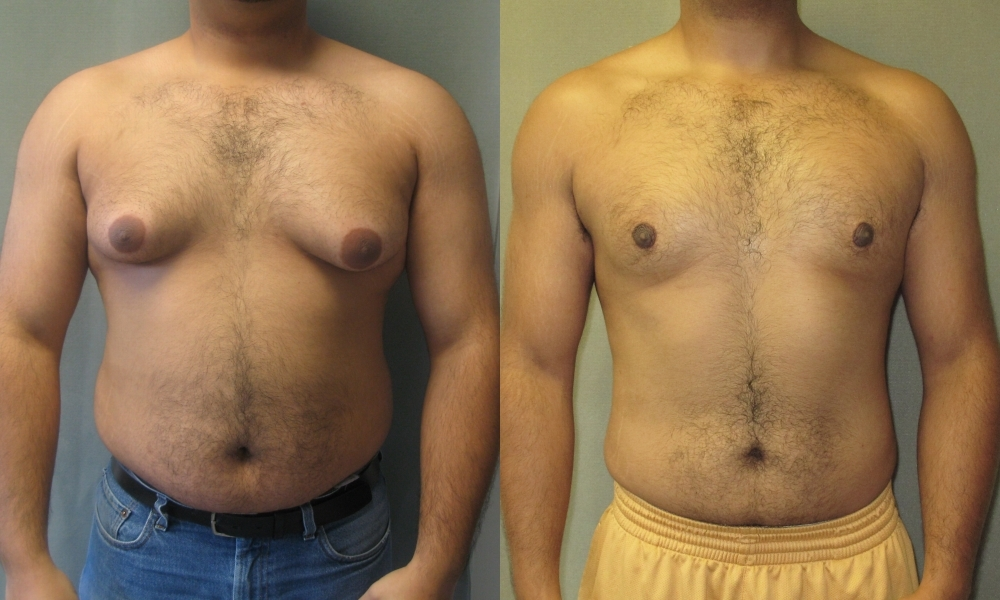
Male with asymmetrical gynecomastia, before and after excision of the gland and liposuction of the waist

If chronic gynecomastia does not respond to medical treatment, surgical removal of glandular breast tissue is usually required. The American Board of Cosmetic Surgery reports surgery is the "most effective known treatment for gynecomastia". Surgical treatment should be considered if the gynecomastia persists for more than 12 months, causes distress (i.e. physical discomfort or psychological distress), and is in the fibrotic stage. In adolescent males, it is recommended that surgery is postponed until puberty is completed (penile and testicular development should reach Tanner scale Stage V).

Surgical approaches to the treatment of gynecomastia include subcutaneous mastectomy, liposuction-assisted mastectomy, laser-assisted liposuction, and laser-lipolysis without liposuction. Complications of mastectomy may include hematoma; surgical wound infection; breast asymmetry; changes in sensation in the breast; necrosis of the areola or nipple; seroma; noticeable or painful scars; and contour deformities. In 2019, 24,123 male patients underwent surgical treatment for gynecomastia in the United States, accounting for a 19% increase since 2000. Thirty-five percent of those patients were between the ages of 20 and 29, and 60% were younger than age 29 at the time of the operation. At an average surgeon's fee of $4,123, gynecomastia surgery was also the 11th most costly male cosmetic surgery of 2019.

=== Others ===
Radiation therapy and tamoxifen have been shown to help prevent gynecomastia and breast pain from developing in prostate cancer patients who will be receiving androgen deprivation therapy. The efficacy of these treatments is limited once gynecomastia has occurred and is therefore most effective when used prophylactically.

In the United States, many insurance companies deny coverage for surgery for gynecomastia treatment or male breast reduction on the basis that it is a cosmetic procedure.

== Prognosis ==
Gynecomastia itself is a benign finding. It does not confer a poor prognosis; for some patients with underlying pathologies such as testicular cancer, the prognosis may be worse. The glandular tissue typically grows under the influence of hormonal stimulation and is often tender or painful. Furthermore, gynecomastia frequently presents social and psychological difficulties such as low self-esteem, depression, or shame.

== Epidemiology ==
Gynecomastia is the most common benign disorder of the male breast tissue and affects 35 percent of men, being most prevalent between the ages of 50 and 69.

New cases of gynecomastia are common in three age populations: newborns, adolescents, and men older than 50 years. Newborn gynecomastia occurs in about 60–90 percent of male babies, and most cases resolve on their own in about 2–3 weeks after delivery. During adolescence, on average, 33 percent of males are estimated to exhibit signs of gynecomastia. Gynecomastia in older men is estimated to be present in 24–65 percent of men between the ages of 50 and 80. Estimates on asymptomatic gynecomastia are about up to 70% in men aged 50 to 69 years.

The prevalence of gynecomastia in men may have increased in recent years, but the epidemiology of the disorder is not fully understood. The use of anabolic steroids and exposure to chemicals that mimic estrogen in cosmetic products, organochlorine pesticides, and industrial chemicals have been suggested as possible factors driving this increase. According to the American Society of Plastic Surgeons, breast reduction surgeries to correct gynecomastia are fairly common but has been a recent decline. In 2020, there were over 18,000 procedures of this type performed in the United States, which is down 11% from 2019.

== History ==
The term gynaecomastia was coined by Galen. He also recognised glandular enlargement of the male breast; however, this wasn't a condition of gynaecomastia according to him. A surgical procedure for treatment of gynaecomastia was described by Albucasis in his second book of Kitab al-Tasrif.

== Society and culture ==
Gynecomastia can result in psychological distress for those with the condition. Support groups exist to help improve the self-esteem of affected people.

Moob, a portmanteau of man and boob, is a popular term to refer to male breasts. Use of anabolic steroids can result in gynecomastia, and male breasts are sometimes referred to using the pejorative bitch tits in bodybuilding communities.

In Murray v. Janssen Pharmaceuticals, Murray was a Risperidone user who was prescribed the medication at age nine and developed male breasts. A jury decided in Murray's favor in November 2015 and awarded him $1.75 million. The $1.75 million jury verdict represented damages for "disfigurement and mental anguish", though it was later reduced to $680,000. In the second portion of the bifurcated trial, the plaintiffs sought to prove that the companies knew and deliberately disregarded evidence that Risperidone could lead to gynecomastia in young males, and nonetheless promoted the medication off-label and released the medication into the open market for prescription and use by patients without disclosing the side effects. The jury found for the plaintiffs in the second portion of the trial and awarded $8 billion in punitive damages. The amount was later reduced to $6.8 million by Judge Kenneth Powell Jr.

In 2019, a 12-person Philadelphia jury awarded $8 billion in punitive damages to plaintiffs tied to the use of risperidone. Risperidone is an atypical antipsychotic that was originally approved to treat psychosis. Still, its use in children, including those with autism spectrum disorder, ADHD, and schizophrenia diagnoses, has grown over the last two decades.

== Etymology ==
The term comes from Greek γυνή gyné (stem gynaik-) 'female' and μαστός mastós 'breast'.

== See also ==
- Breast hypertrophy – Rare human disease
- Male bra – Pieces of clothing that fit tightly around the skin
- Male lactation – Production of milk in male mammals
- Mammoplasia – Normal or spontaneous enlargement of breasts
