= Athelia (disease) =

Absence of the nipple

- Specialty: Medical genetics

Athelia is the congenital absence of one or both nipples. It is a rare condition. It sometimes occurs on one side in children with the Poland sequence and on both sides in certain types of ectodermal dysplasia.

== Etymology ==
Athelia, A-thelia, from the Greek "A", without, and "thelium" (singular), "thelia" (plural) nipple(s).
