= Breast hypertrophy =

Rare human disease

- Specialty: Gynecology, endocrinology
- Symptoms: Excessively large breast tissue
- Types: Macromastia; Gigantomastia
- Risk factors: Increased levels or heightened sensitivity to certain hormones and/or growth factors

Breast hypertrophy is a rare medical condition of the breast connective tissues in which the breasts become excessively large. The condition is often divided based on the severity into two types, macromastia and gigantomastia. Hypertrophy of the breast tissues may be caused by increased histologic sensitivity to certain hormones such as female sex hormones, prolactin, and growth factors. Breast hypertrophy is a benign progressive enlargement, which can occur in both breasts (bilateral) or only in one breast (unilateral). It was first scientifically described in 1648.

== Description and types ==
The indication is a total breast weight that exceeds approximately 3% of the total body weight. There are varying definitions of what is considered to be excessive breast tissue, that is the expected breast tissue plus extraordinary breast tissue, ranging from as little as 0.6 kilograms (1.3 lb) up to 2.5 kilograms (5.5 lb) with most physicians defining macromastia as excessive tissue of over 1.5 kilograms (3.3 lb). Some resources distinguish between macromastia (Greek, macro: large, mastos: breast), where excessive tissue is less than 2.5 kg, and gigantomastia (Greek, gigantikos: giant), where excessive tissue is more than 2.5 kg. The enlargement can cause muscular discomfort and over-stretching of the skin envelope, which can lead in some cases to ulceration.

Hypertrophy of the breast can affect the breasts equally, but usually affects one breast more than the other, thereby causing asymmetry, when one breast is larger than the other. The condition can also individually affect the nipples and areola instead of or in addition to the entire breast. The effect can produce a minor size variation to an extremely large breast asymmetry. Breast hypertrophy is classified in one of five ways: as either pubertal (juvenile hypertrophy), gestational (gravid macromastia), in adult women without any obvious cause, associated with penicillamine therapy, and associated with extreme obesity. Many definitions of macromastia and gigantomastia are based on the term of "excessive breast tissue", and are therefore somewhat arbitrary.

A total of 115 cases of gigantomastia had been reported in the literature as of 2008.

=== Juvenile breast hypertrophy ===
When gigantomastia occurs in pubescent females, the medical condition is known as juvenile macromastia or juvenile gigantomastia and sometimes as virginal breast hypertrophy or virginal mammary hypertrophy although the term virginal is now considered misleading and outdated. Along with the excessive breast size, other symptoms include red, itchy lesions and pain in the breasts. A diagnosis is made when an adolescent's breasts grow rapidly and achieve great weight, usually soon after their first menstrual period. Some doctors suggest that the rapid breast development occurs before the onset of menstruation.

Some adolescents with juvenile breast hypertrophy experience breast growth at a steady rate for several years, after which the breasts rapidly develop exceeding normal growth. Some adolescent females experience minimal or negligible breast growth until their breasts suddenly grow very rapidly in a short period of time. This may cause considerable physical discomfort. Individuals with JBH often experience an excessive growth of their nipples as well. In severe cases of JBH, clitoromegaly occurs.

At the onset of puberty, some females who have experienced little or no breast development can reportedly reach three or more cup sizes within a few days (see below).

As of 1992, 70 cases of juvenile breast hypertrophy had been reported.

=== Gestational breast hypertrophy ===
This same effect can also occur at the onset of pregnancy or between the 16th to 20th week of gestation. When the swelling in the connective tissue occurs after birth, it can negatively impact long term milk supply. The swelling increases with each subsequent pregnancy.

The extremely rapid growth of the breasts can result in intense heat. The woman's breasts can generate extraordinary discomfort, turning feverish, red, itchy, and even causing the skin to peel. The swelling can suppress the milk supply, pinching off the milk ducts, and leading to mastitis.

Gestational gigantomastia is estimated to occur in 1 out of every 28,000 to 100,000 pregnancies.

Breast size in women with gestational breast hypertrophy typically reverts to approximately pre-pregnancy size or near it after pregnancy and cessation of breastfeeding. This is not always the case however and in some only partial reduction in breast size may occur, necessitating surgical breast reduction.

=== Other types of breast hypertrophy ===
Only 15% of cases of breast hypertrophy are unrelated to puberty or pregnancy. Other types and causes of breast hypertrophy include idiopathic, drug-induced (e.g., penicillamine, ciclosporin, bucillamine), autoimmunity-associated, tumors, and syndromes. Two case reports of prepubertal breast hypertrophy, both in infants, have been reported.

== Causes ==
The underlying cause of the rapidly growing breast connective tissue, resulting in gigantic proportions, has not been well elucidated. However, proposed factors have included increased levels/expression of or heightened sensitivity to certain hormones (e.g., estrogen, progesterone, and prolactin) and/or growth factors (e.g., hepatocyte growth factor, insulin-like growth factor 1, and epidermal growth factor) in the breasts. Macromastic breasts are reported to be composed mainly of adipose and fibrous tissue, while glandular tissue remains essentially stable.

Macromastia occurs in approximately half of women with aromatase excess syndrome (a condition of hyperestrogenism). Hyperprolactinaemia has been reported as a cause of some cases of macromastia. Macromastia has also been associated with hypercalcaemia (which is thought to be due to excessive production of parathyroid hormone-related protein) and, rarely, systemic lupus erythematosus and pseudoangiomatous stromal hyperplasia. It is also notable that approximately two-thirds of women with macromastia are obese. Aside from aromatase (as in aromatase excess syndrome), at least two other genetic mutations (one in PTEN, the other "MDNS" not yet located to gene level) have been implicated in causing macromastia.

A handful of drugs have been associated with gigantomastia, including penicillamine, bucillamine, neothetazone, ciclosporin, indinavir, and prednisolone.

== Treatment ==
Medical treatment has not proven consistently effective. Medical regimens have included tamoxifen, progesterone, bromocriptine, the gonadotropin-releasing hormone agonist leuprorelin, and testosterone. Gestational macromastia has been treated with breast reduction drugs alone without surgery. Surgical therapy includes reduction mammaplasty and mastectomy. However, breast reduction is not clinically indicated unless at least 1.8 kilograms (4.0 lb) of tissue per breast needs to be removed. In the majority of cases of macromastia, surgery is medically unnecessary, depending on body height. Topical treatment includes regimens of ice to cool the breasts.

Treatment of hyperprolactinemia-associated macromastia with D_{2} receptor agonists such as bromocriptine and cabergoline has been found to be effective in some, but not all cases. Danazol, an antiestrogen and weak androgen, has also been found to be effective in the treatment of macromastia.

When hypertrophy occurs in adolescence, noninvasive treatments, including pharmaceutical treatment, hormone therapy, and steroid use are not usually recommended due to known and unknown side effects. Once breast growth rate has stabilized, breast reduction may be an appropriate choice. In some instances after aggressive or surgical treatment, the breast may continue to grow or re-grow, a complete mastectomy may be recommended as a last resort.

Pregnancy is recognized as the second most common reason for hypertrophy. When secondary to pregnancy, it may resolve itself without treatment after the pregnancy ends.

== Society and culture ==
=== Difficulties ===
Extremely large breasts are a source of considerable attention. Some women try to hide or mask their breasts with special clothing, including minimizing bras or breast binding clothing. Women with this condition may be subject to psychological problems due to unwanted attention or harassment. Depression is common in those affected.

In the case of a 12-year-old Japanese girl reported in 1993, her "massively enlarged" breasts caused her "intense psychological problems, incapacitating her in school activities and social relations". Actress Soleil Moon Frye, who starred as a child in the sitcom Punky Brewster, reported in an interview with People magazine that boys taunted her, calling her "Punky Boobster". It affected her professional and social life negatively. "People started to think of me as a bimbo," she said in the interview. "I couldn't sit up straight without people looking at me like I was a prostitute[.]" She had breast reduction surgery at the age of 15.

Finding large bra sizes and styles that fit is challenging. Also, larger bras are more costly, challenging to find, and unflattering to the wearer. Ill-fitting bras with narrow straps can cause chronic irritation, redness, and indentations in the shoulders. Skin rashes under the breasts are common, particularly during warm weather. Heavy breasts may cause headaches, neck pain, upper and lower back pain, and numbness or tingling in the fingers. There is a possible connection between macromastia and carpal-tunnel-syndrome.

=== Medical insurance coverage ===
Insurance companies in the United States typically require the physician to provide evidence that a woman's large breasts cause headaches or back and neck pain before they will pay for breast reduction. Insurance companies also mandate a woman who is overweight, which is often the case with gigantomastia, to first lose a certain amount of weight. They also commonly require the patient to try alternative treatments like physical therapy for a year or more.

=== Reported instances ===
==== Gigantomastia ====
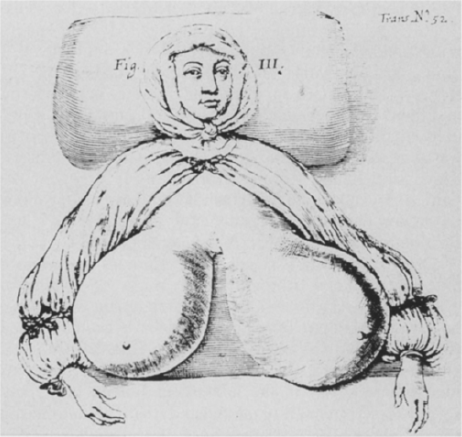
The first recorded case of gigantomastia, diagnosed in a 23- or 24-year-old Elizabeth Travers, 1669. In 1669, the physician William Durston drew this illustration of the first recorded case of non-gravid gigantomastia.

The earliest description and illustration of gigantomastia dates to 1669. In July of that year the Plymouth physician William Durston wrote to the Royal Society, reporting the case of a patient named Elizabeth Travers. Durston's account was soon published in the Society's Philosophical Transactions, and includes the following account of the onset of symptoms:

Elizabeth Treves, [sic] 23. or 24. years of age, fair of complexion, brown-hair'd, of an healthy constitution, low of stature, of honest repute, but of mean and poor parentage, near this Town [Plymouth], was on Friday July 3d, 1669 in good health, and went well to bed, where she took as good rest and sleep, as ever before, but in the morning, when she awaken'd, and attempted to turn herself in her bed, was not able, finding her Breasts so swell'd, that she was affrighted to an astonishment. Then endeavoring to sit up, the weight of her Breasts fastned her to her bed; where she hath layn ever since, yet without all pain and weakness either in her Breasts, or in any other part.

Durston later wrote to the Society to report that Travers had died on October 21 of the same year, four months after the onset of enlargement. One breast removed after the woman's death weighed 64 lb (29 kg). Durston had attempted to treat Travers with salivation, which he believed reduced her breasts slightly but which she did not like as a treatment option, and then cauterization followed by incision by knife in the hope that excess fluid would be found to drain, but this was unsuccessful as it was healthy breast tissue, notable only for its massive enlargement and thus lacking excess fluid to drain.

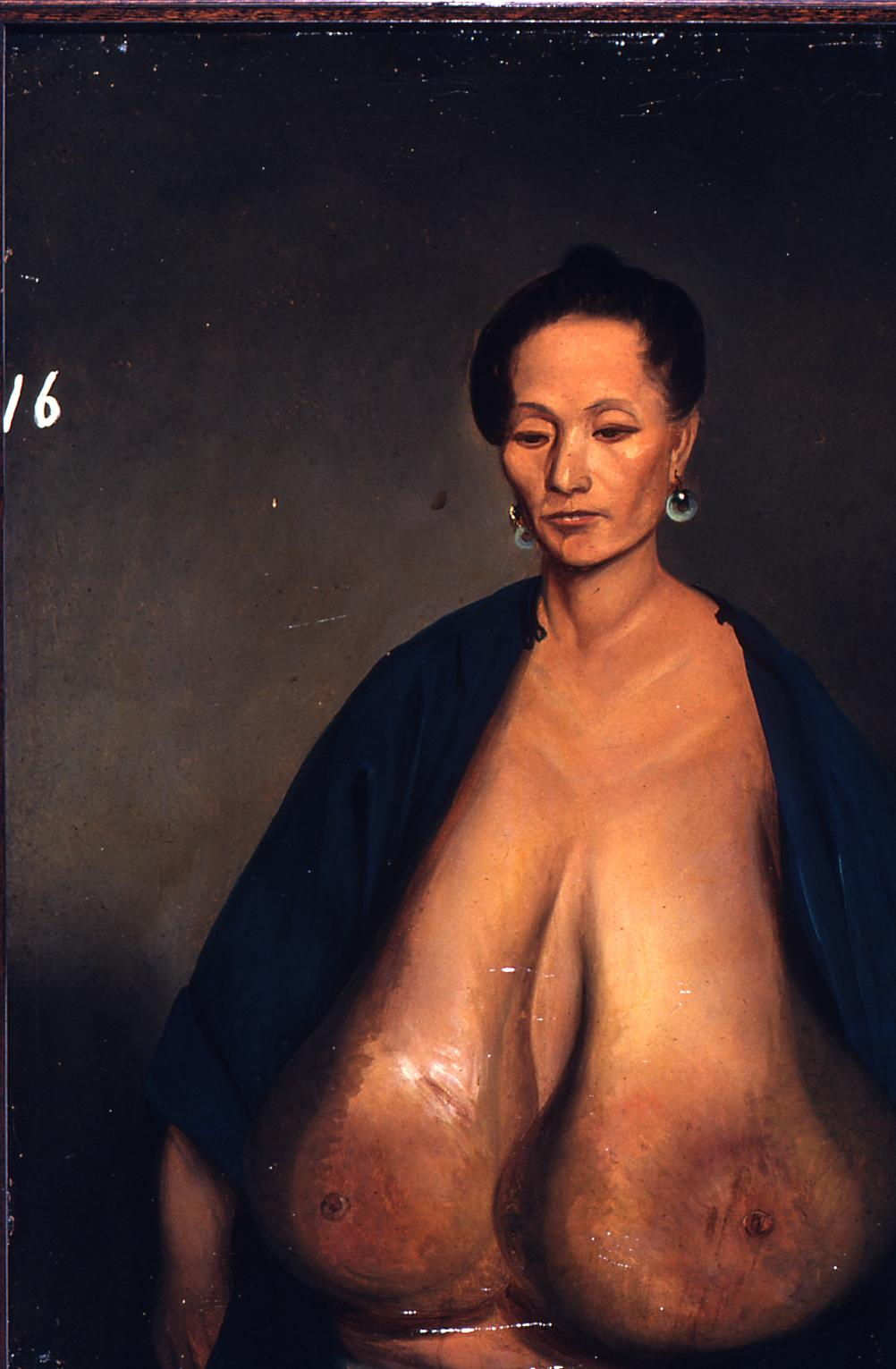
A painting by Lam Qua of Lu-shi, age 42, on April 17, 1848, prior to breast reduction surgery

On April 17, 1848, a 42-year-old woman named Lu-shi was treated for hypertrophy in a Chinese hospital. She was treated by a missionary physician. On December 24, 1849, the left breast, measuring 67 cm (26 in) in circumference, and weighing 2.7 kg (6.0 lb), was removed in a procedure lasting three and a half minutes. The right breast was removed one month later. It measured 61 cm (24 in) in circumference and weighed 2.5 kg (5.5 lb).

In 2005, a woman reported that her breasts grew at puberty from nothing to a C cup in one month. When she became pregnant for the first time, her breasts increased two cup sizes in a few days. Immediately after her first birth, her breasts grew three cup sizes. After her second child was born, her breasts increased six cup sizes. After her third childbirth, they grew ten cup sizes, and after her fourth child was born, they grew nine cup sizes. In this instance, the swelling abated about 10 days after childbirth, but her bra cup size remained E to a G for the next year. About one year postpartum, her breasts rapidly atrophied to AA cup size.

One of the most severe cases of macromastia was reported from Ilorin in Nigeria. In 2007, Ganiyu Adebisi Rahman and his colleagues reported the case of a 26-year-old woman who presented with massive swelling of her breasts and bilateral axillary swellings of 6 years duration. Rahman led a team of surgeons in Ilorin to perform a total bilateral excision of the hypertrophied axillary breasts, and bilateral breast amputation with composite nipple-areola complex graft of the normally located breasts. The total weight of the breast tissues removed was 44.8 kilograms (99 lb).

Another extreme case was observed in 2008 in Maria Vittoria Hospital in Turin, Italy, where the amount removed from both breasts was 17.2 kg (38 lb). The growth occurred during puberty making it a case of juvenile gigantomastia, but the patient did not seek treatment until the age of 29. Another extreme case was observed on August 28, 2003, when a 24-year-old woman was admitted to the Clinical Center Skopje in North Macedonia with gigantomastia of pregnancy and the amount later removed from both breasts was 15 kg (33 lb) in total. A second case in North Macedonia was reported when the breasts of a 30-year-old woman from a remote mountain village in eastern North Macedonia suddenly grew to more than 30 kilograms (66 lb) total.

As the disorder becomes more widely known, media reports have increased. French Canadian Isabelle Lanthier appeared on Montel Williams' talk show where she told how her chest grew from 86 cm (34 in) to 133 cm (52 in) in five months during her pregnancy. At their largest, one breast weighed 6.8 kg (15 lb) and the other 5.4 kg (12 lb). Her husband custom-made a special bra to support her breasts.

In 2007, a Chilean TV station covered the story of 32-year-old Yasna Galleguillos from Antofagasta, who experienced ongoing back pain, making everyday tasks very difficult to perform. She underwent breast reduction surgery to relieve her pain. Surgeons removed 4.25 kilograms (9.4 lb) from one breast and 3.33 kilograms (7.3 lb) from the other breast.

On October 29, 2009, the Philippine television network GMA News and Public Affairs, producers of Wish Ko Lang ("Just My Wish") hosted by Vicky Morales, profiled the story of Pilma Cabrijas, a 30-year-old woman affected by gigantomastia. The woman was told by a folk healer that her condition may have been caused by a curse. The measured bust circumference without appropriate bra support was 160 cm (63 in). The weight of her breasts was not reported in detail, but seemed to weigh "as much as two children." She had breast reduction surgery performed, but her breasts regrew. The producers of Wish Ko Lang paid for additional surgery.

==== Juvenile breast hypertrophy ====
In 1993, the Japanese journal Surgery Today reported on the case of a 12-year-old girl. Only 152 centimetres (60 in) tall and weighing 43 kilograms (95 lb), her breasts began to develop at age 11 before the onset of menstruation. Over the next eight months, both breasts grew abnormally large, and physicians treating her found that her physiological development was normal except for her breasts. The weight produced by their symmetrical and massive enlargement resulted in marked curvature of the spine. Lab tests of her blood for hormones and biochemical substances showed normal values, though tests revealed that it might have been caused by hypersensitivity to estrogen. She underwent a bilateral reduction mammoplasty. Surgeons removed 2 kilograms (4.4 lb) of tissue from her right breast and 1.9 kilograms (4.2 lb) from her left breast. She was administered tamoxifen afterward to suppress breast regrowth.

A more severe case of juvenile breast hypertrophy of an 11-year-old girl was reported in 2008. The breasts had begun to grow rapidly at puberty and had reached the point of causing physical and psychological impairment and possible respiratory compromise after ten months. The skin was intact without any ulcerations. Blood chemistry and endocrine investigation was normal. A bilateral reduction mammaplasty with free nipple grafts was performed. 6 kg (13 lb) of the right breast and 6.5 kg (14 lb) of the left breast were removed, resulting in a removal of 12.5 kg (28 lb) of tissue in all (24% of the total body weight).

== See also ==
- Mammoplasia – Normal or spontaneous enlargement of breasts
- Norma Stitz – American fetish model
