= Hyperestrogenism =

Excess estrogen in the body

- Other names: Hyperestrogenic state,
- Specialty: Endocrinology

Hyperestrogenism, hyperestrogenic state, or estrogen excess, is a medical condition characterized by an excessive amount of estrogenic activity in the body.

== Signs and symptoms ==
Signs of hyperestrogenism may include heightened levels of one or more of the estrogen sex hormones (usually estradiol and/or estrone), lowered levels of follicle-stimulating hormone and/or luteinizing hormone (due to suppression of the hypothalamic–pituitary–gonadal axis by estrogen), and lowered levels of androgens such as testosterone (generally only relevant to males). Symptoms of the condition in women may consist of menstrual irregularities, amenorrhea, abnormal vaginal bleeding, and enlargement of the uterus and breasts. It may also present as isosexual precocity in children and as hypogonadism, gynecomastia, feminization, impotence, and loss of libido in males. If left untreated, hyperestrogenism may increase the risk of estrogen-sensitive cancers such as breast cancer later in life.

== Causes ==
Hyperestrogenism can be caused by ovarian tumors, genetic conditions such as aromatase excess syndrome (also known as familial hyperestrogenism), or overconsumption of exogenous sources of estrogen, including medications used in hormone replacement therapy and hormonal contraception. Liver cirrhosis is another cause, though through lowered metabolism of estrogen, not oversecretion or overconsumption like the aforementioned. It's necessary to know there exist two kinds of hyperestrogenism: Absolute (more concentration than usual of estrogen) and relative (a normal concentration of estrogen, higher with respect to progesterone). An example of absolute hyperestrogenism could be: persistent follicles that later undergo atresia without ovulating; and the example of relative hyperestrogenism: luteal insufficiency.

== Treatments ==
Treatment may consist of surgery in the case of tumors, lower doses of estrogen in the case of exogenously-mediated estrogen excess, and estrogen-suppressing medications like gonadotropin-releasing hormone analogues and progestogens. In addition, androgens may be supplemented in the case of males.

== See also ==
- Aromatase deficiency
- Aromatase excess syndrome
- Estrogen insensitivity syndrome
- High-dose estrogen
- Hyperandrogenism
- Hypergonadism
- Hypergonadotropic hypergonadism
- Hypoandrogenism
- Hypoestrogenism
- Hypogonadism
