= Hypergonadotropic hypergonadism =

- Specialty: Endocrinology

Hypergonadotropic hypergonadism is an endocrine situation and subtype of hypergonadism in which both gonadotropin levels and gonadal function, such as sex hormone production, are abnormally high. It can be associated with hyperandrogenism and hyperestrogenism and with gonadal cysts and tumors. It can be caused by medications such as gonadotropins, gonadotropin-releasing hormone agonists, nonsteroidal antiandrogens, and selective estrogen receptor modulators, as well as conditions like human chorionic gonadotropin-secreting tumors, complete androgen insensitivity syndrome, and estrogen insensitivity syndrome.

== See also ==
- Hypergonadotropic hypogonadism
- Hypogonadotropic hypogonadism
