= Aromatase excess syndrome =

- Other names: Hereditary prepubertal gynecomastia
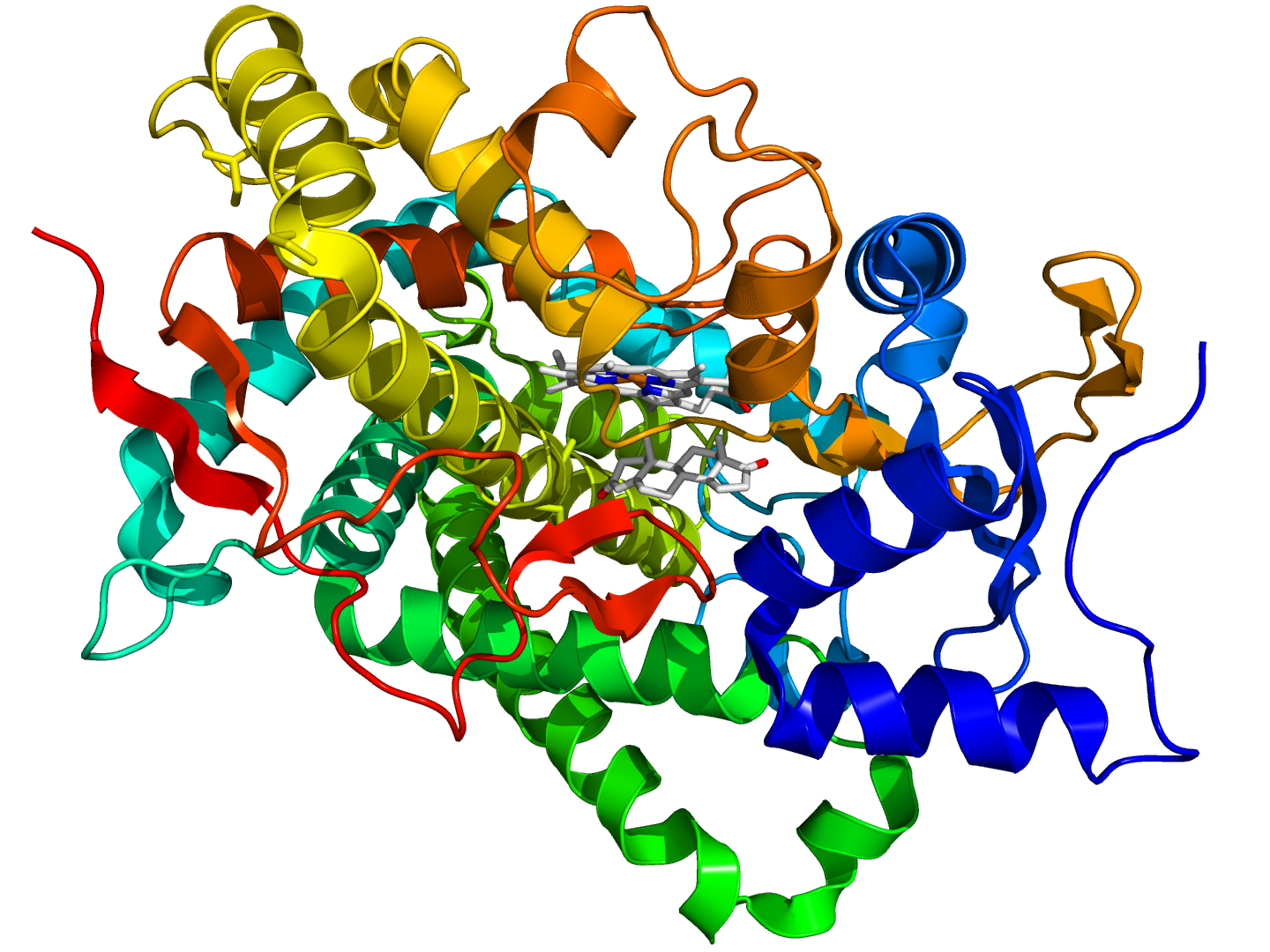
- AEXS results when the function of aromatase is hyperactive. The aromatase protein (pictured) is responsible for the biosynthesis of estrogens like estradiol in the human body.
- Specialty: Endocrinology

Aromatase excess syndrome (AES or AEXS) is a rarely diagnosed genetic and endocrine syndrome which is characterized by an overexpression of aromatase, the enzyme responsible for the biosynthesis of the estrogen sex hormones from the androgens, in turn resulting in excessive levels of circulating estrogens and, accordingly, symptoms of hyperestrogenism. It affects both sexes, manifesting itself in males as marked or complete phenotypical feminization (with the exception of the genitalia; i.e., no ambiguous genitalia) and in females as hyperfeminization.

To date, 30 males and 8 females with AEXS among 15 and 7 families, respectively, have been described in the medical literature.

== Signs and symptoms ==
Observed physiological abnormalities of the condition include a dramatic overexpression of aromatase and, accordingly, excessive levels of estrogens including estrone and estradiol and a very high rate of peripheral conversion of androgens to estrogens. In one study, cellular aromatase mRNA expression was found to be at least 10 times higher in a female patient compared to the control, and the estradiol/testosterone ratio after an injection of testosterone in a male patient was found to be 100 times greater than the control. Additionally, in another study, androstenedione, testosterone, and dihydrotestosterone (DHT) were found to be either low or normal in males, and follicle-stimulating hormone (FSH) levels were very low (likely due to suppression by estrogen, which has antigonadotropic effects as a form of negative feedback inhibition on sex steroid production in sufficiently high amounts), whereas luteinizing hormone (LH) levels were normal.

According to a recent review, estrone levels have been elevated in 17 of 18 patients (94%), while estradiol levels have been elevated only in 13 of 27 patients (48%). As such, estrone is the main estrogen elevated in the condition. In more than half of patients, circulating androstenedione and testosterone levels are low to subnormal. The ratio of circulating estradiol to testosterone is >10 in 75% of cases. FSH levels are said to be consistently low in the condition, while LH levels are in the low to normal range.

It is notable that gynecomastia has been observed in patients in whom estradiol levels are within the normal range. This has been suggested to be due to in situ conversion of adrenal androgens into estrone and then estradiol (via local 17β-HSD) in breast tissue (where aromatase activity may be particularly high).

The symptoms of AEXS, in males, include heterosexual precocity (precocious puberty with phenotypically-inappropriate secondary sexual characteristics; i.e., a fully or mostly feminized appearance), severe prepubertal or peripubertal gynecomastia (development of breasts in males before or around puberty), high-pitched voice, sparse facial hair, hypogonadism (dysfunctional gonads), oligozoospermia (low sperm count), small testes, micropenis (an unusually small penis), advanced bone maturation, an earlier peak height velocity (an accelerated rate of growth in regards to height), and short final stature due to early epiphyseal closure. The incidence of gynecomastia appears to be 100%, with 20 of 30 male cases opting for mastectomy according to a review.

In females, symptoms of AEXS include isosexual precocity (precocious puberty with phenotypically-appropriate secondary sexual characteristics), macromastia (excessively large breasts), an enlarged uterus, menstrual irregularities, and, similarly to males, accelerated bone maturation and short final height. Of seven females described in one report, three (43%) had macromastia. Pubertal breast hypertrophy in association with AEXS has been described in two young girls.

Fertility, though usually affected to one degree or another—especially in males—is not always impaired significantly enough to prevent sexual reproduction, as evidenced by vertical transmission of the condition by both sexes.

== Cause ==
The root cause of AEXS is not entirely clear, but it has been elucidated that inheritable, autosomal dominant genetic mutations affecting CYP19A1, the gene which encodes aromatase, are involved in its etiology. Different mutations are associated with differential severity of symptoms, such as mild to severe gynecomastia. For example, duplications result in relatively mild gynecomastia, while deletions, resulting in chimeric genes, cause moderate or severe gynecomastia.

== Diagnosis ==
Genetic tests are now available to identify the variants in CYP19A1 associated with AEXS. The National Institutes of Health maintains a list.

== Treatment ==
Several treatments have been found to be effective in managing AEXS, including aromatase inhibitors and gonadotropin-releasing hormone analogues in both sexes, androgen replacement therapy with non-aromatizable androgens such as DHT in males, and progestogens (which, by virtue of their antigonadotropic properties at high doses, suppress estrogen levels) in females. In addition, male patients often seek bilateral mastectomy, whereas females may opt for breast reduction if warranted.

Medical treatment of AEXS is not absolutely necessary, but it is recommended as the condition, if left untreated, may lead to excessively large breasts (which may necessitate surgical reduction), problems with fertility, and an increased risk of endometriosis and estrogen-dependent cancers such as breast and endometrial cancers later in life. At least one case of male breast cancer has been reported.

== Society and culture ==
=== Notable cases ===
It has been hypothesized that the Pharaoh Akhenaten (husband of Queen Nefertiti) and other members of the 18th Dynasty of ancient Egypt may have had AEXS. Akhenaten and his relatives, including men and young girls, many of whom were the product of inbreeding, are described as having breasts and wide hips, and Akhenaten was described as having a "beautiful and feminine voice," unusual physical features that could be explained by AEXS or another form of hereditary hyperestrogenism. However, numerous other physical abnormalities were also present in the Akhenaten family, and a variety of other conditions have been proposed to explain the observations instead. Most recently, Loeys–Dietz syndrome was proposed as a probable cause, with gynecomastia and feminization possibly being caused by liver cirrhosis-induced hyperestrogenism.

== See also ==
- Androgen insensitivity syndrome
- Aromatase deficiency
- Congenital estrogen deficiency
- Disorders of sex development
- Estrogen insensitivity syndrome
- Hyperestrogenism
- Inborn errors of steroid metabolism
