= Aromatase deficiency =

- Other names: Congenital estrogen deficiency
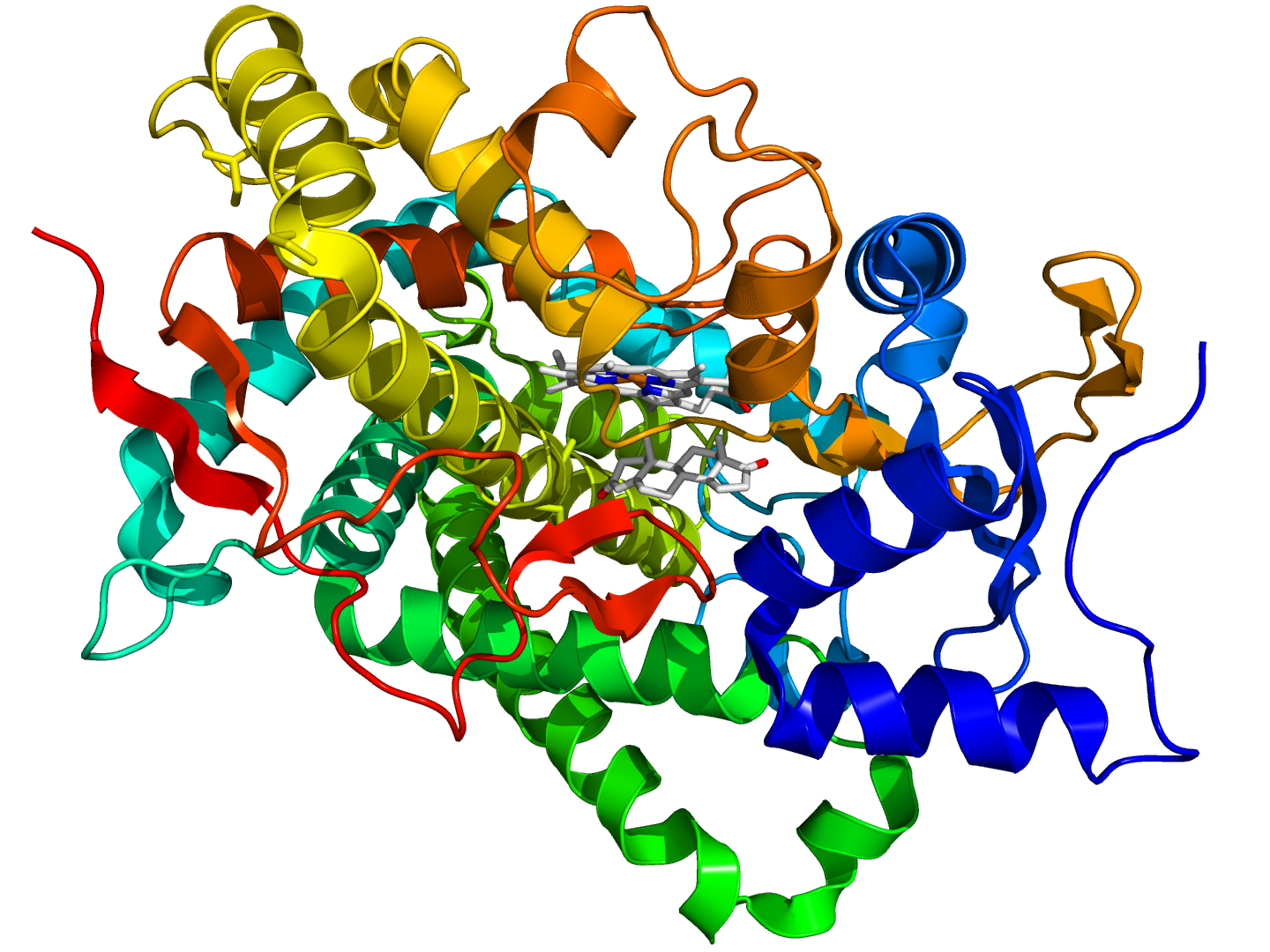
- AES results when the function of aromatase is impaired. The aromatase protein (pictured) is required for the biosynthesis of oestrogens like oestradiol in the human body.
- Specialty: Endocrinology
- Complications: Virilisation, tall stature, primary amenorrhea, multicystic ovaries,
- Usual onset: Adulthood
- Duration: Lifetime
- Types: Endocrine Disruptive Disorder
- Causes: Genetic mutations of CYP19
- Diagnostic method: Extremely low level of oestrogen and elevated level of androgens
- Treatment: Transdermal oestradiol replacement, hormone replacement therapy

Aromatase deficiency is a rare condition characterized by extremely low levels or complete absence of the enzyme aromatase activity in the body. It is an autosomal recessive disorder resulting from various mutations of the gene CYP19 (P450arom) which can lead to ambiguous genitalia and delayed puberty in females, continued linear growth into adulthood and osteoporosis in males, and virilization in mothers carrying fetuses with the disorder. As of 2020, fewer than 15 cases have been identified in genetically male individuals and at least 30 cases in genetically female individuals.

== Signs and symptoms ==
The deficiency causes the virilization of XX fetuses. The onset of symptoms usually occurs in adolescence or early adulthood. The lack of estrogen results in the presentation of primary amenorrhea and tall stature. The taller than expected height occurs because estrogen normally causes fusion of the epiphyseal growth plates in the bones, and, in its absence, the growth plates will not fuse and the patient will keep growing taller. The gonadotropins LH and FSH will both be elevated and female patients present with polycystic ovaries. Furthermore, the low estrogen will predispose those with the condition to osteoporosis.

=== Female ===
- After birth, female infants usually display ambiguous genitalia including labioscrotal fusion, clitoromegaly, and phallic genitalia. Hyperandrogenism is present at birth along with low level of estrogen in the blood. However, they have normal internal female genitalia. Known cases presented with Prader scale ratings between II and V, with most classified as IV (11 out of 23 cases) or III (7 out of 23 cases). Some 46,XX individuals are assigned male at birth because of sufficiently virilized genitalia and a male gender identity persisted in a subset of these cases.
- During puberty, progressive signs of virilization such as growing of body hair can be observed along with a failure to undergo normal female puberty due to the lack of estradiol action. The disruption of the LHRH-LH/FSH axis causes bone aging to be delayed with the absence of growth spurt.
- In adulthood, symptoms include virilization, absence of breast development, primary amenorrhea and infertility, and polycystic ovaries.
- Other symptoms include hypergonadotropic hypogonadism, hypoplastic ovaries, and tall stature.

=== Male ===
Symptoms are generally manifested in adulthood:

- Tall stature, osteopenia, osteoporosis, Type II Diabetes, hyperinsulinemia, acanthosis nigricans, lipid metabolism disorders, and liver function impairment.

=== During pregnancy ===
During gestation, a fetus with aromatase deficiency can cause the mother to become virilized, causing deepening of the voice, cystic acne, more hair growth than normal, clitoromegaly, and hirsutism. The mother also has an increased level of circulating testosterone. However, the symptoms normally regress post-partum.

=== Complications ===
==== Pregnant mother ====
Aromatase is an estrogen synthase that synthesizes estrone (E1) and estradiol (E2) from Androstenedione and Testosterone respectively. During pregnancy, the placenta, which is fetal tissue, synthesizes large amounts of androstenedione and testosterone, intermediates in the biosynthesis of estrogens, but cannot convert them to estrogens due to the absence of aromatase. The level of accumulated androgens in the mother can elevate to 100 times higher than normal cycling levels, which subsequently virilizes both the mother and the fetus. The mother will experience cystic acne, deepening of the voice and hirsutism. However, these symptoms are normally resolved following parturition.

If the fetus is a male, it will develop normal male genitalia and will proceed to grow normally and exhibit secondary male sex characteristics. If the fetus is a female, it will be born with ambiguous genitalia including labioscrotal fusion and a greatly enlarged phallus.

==== Female ====
Aromatase deficient females cannot synthesize estrone or estradiol in the absence of aromatase. The amount of androgens will accumulate at a very high rate in the blood, disrupting the LHRH-LH/FSH axis, which can potentially lead to polycystic ovaries in adulthood. In the absence of estrogen, high levels of circulating LH and FSH can result in Hypergonadotropic hypogonadism.

While females begin to virilize and grow hair in various places during adolescence, they are unable to undergo normal female puberty without the presence of estradiol, subsequently causing primary amenorrhea, clitoromegaly, and absence of breast development. As puberty fails, the growth spurt is absent and bone age is delayed. Without treatment, the collection of excess androgens in the blood can lead to the development of polycystic ovaries.

==== Male ====
Aromatase deficient males experience normal growth into adulthood. A very low level of circulating estrogen (<7pg/mL) results in a higher level of FSH and LH in the blood. Elevated levels of androgens do not contribute to harmonic skeletal muscle growth like estrogen does, thus patients exhibit eunuchoid body habitus.

Patients are generally tall in stature and have a pattern of persistent linear bone growth into adulthood. Without estrogen, the epiphyseal plates cannot fuse together properly, resulting in continuous height growth. Since estrogen is a necessary steroid to maintain bone homeostasis, low levels of estrogen also result in osteopenia and osteoporosis of the lumbar spine and cortical bone. Low estrogen is also thought to be linked to abnormal lipid profile and hyperinsulinemia in men, though the mechanism is unknown.

== Cause ==
=== Gene mutation ===
Autosomal recessive

Aromatase deficiency is an autosomal recessive disease with most of the mutations occurring along the highly conservative regions of the gene. Both homozygous and heterozygous mutations have been identified along various locations of the exon on the P450 arom (CYP19) gene localized on chromosome15p21.1. In addition, mutations in cytochrome P450 oxidoreductase (POR), which is required for enzymatic activity of aromatase, can also cause aromatase deficiency.

Table 1. Summary of known homozygous mutations in P450 arom (CPY19) gene
Gender	Mutation	Transcription Results	Aromatase Activity (%)
Female	GT to GC at the 5' Terminus of intron VI	An extra 87 bp insertion, between exon VI and intron VI	0.3%
Female/Male	Single base change at bp 1123: C to T in exon X	Cysteine being transcribed instead of Arginine at position 375 (R375C)	0.2%
Female	Point mutation (R457X) in exon X	No Transcription	-
Female	Mutation Valine 370 to Methionine in exon IX	-	-
Female	1600 bp deletion in exon V	Aromatase lacking 59 Amino Acids	-
Female	Point mutation in exon X (R435C)	Missense mutation that causes loss of function	-
Female	Deletion of a single Phenylalanine residue at codon 234 in exon VI	-	-
Female	568C insertion in CYP19A1	190 Leucine was changed to Proline	-
Female	Single base change at bp 1094 (G to A) in exon IX	Glutamine instead of Arginine being transcribed at position 365 (R365Q)	0.4
Male	C-base deletion in exon V	Resulting in a stop codon after 21 codons	0.0
Male	C to A substitution in intron V, at 3' splicing acceptor site before exon VI	Premature stop codon	-
Male	Insertion of 21 bp at the codon 353 in exon IX	-	-
Male	Single base change at bp 628 (G to A) in the last nucleotide of exon V	Glutamic acid instead of a Lysine being transcribed at position 210 (E210K)	1.0

Table 2. Summary of known heterozygous mutations in P450 arom (CPY19) gene
Gender	Mutation	Transcription Results	Aromatase Activity (%)
Female	Single base changes in exon X at bp 1303: C to T	Cysteine was transcribed instead of Arginine at position 435 (R435C)	1.1
Female	Single base changes in exon X at bp 1310: G to A	Tyrosine was transcribed instead of Cysteine at position 437 (C437Y)	0.0
Female	Point mutation (G to A) at the splicing point between exon and intron III	No transcription	0.0
Female	Base pair deletion occurring at P408 (CCC) in exon IX	Nonsense codon 111 bp were transcribed down in the CYP19	0.0
Female	Point mutation (GAA to AAA) at bp 628 in exon V	Glutamic acid transcribed instead of lysine at position 210 (E210K)	0.0
Female	A Base pair deletion occurring at E412 in exon IX	Transcribed a stop codon 98 bp downstream	0.0
Male	Point mutation (ATG to AGG) at bp 380 in exon IV	Methionine was transcribed instead of arginine at position 127 (M127R)	-
Male	Point mutation (CGC to CAC) at bp 1123 in exon IX	2. Arginine was transcribed instead of histidine at position 375 (R375H)	-
Male	23 bp deletion in exon IV	Premature stop codon in exon IV	-
Male	Point mutation (G to T) at first bp in intron IX	Alternative splicing?	-

== Diagnosis ==
Aromatase deficiency in a fetus can be predicted when the pregnant mother displays virilization. A female infant can be physically diagnosed due to the abnormal genitalia along with hormonal blood test. The diagnosis can be considered for any virilized 46,XX child when congenital adrenal hyperplasia is excluded. The condition can be suspected for males in their late teens or twenties who have continued linear growth and bone pain. Excessively low level of estrogen and elevated levels of androgens are diagnostic markers for aromatase deficiency in both males and females. Testosterone level in the urine may be normal or elevated.

== Treatment ==
In males, transdermal estradiol replacement enables closure of the epiphyseal plates, increases bone density, promotes skeletal maturation, lowers FSH and LH level to normal, and decreases insulin blood concentration.

In females, hormonal replacement therapy, such as cyclic oral therapy of conjugated estrogen, leads to breast development, menses, pubertal growth spurt, resolution of ovarian cysts, suppression of elevated FSH and LH levels in the blood, and proper bone growth. Ambiguous genitalia, clitoromegaly, and ovarian cysts can be removed surgically.

== History ==
Aromatase deficiency was first recorded in literature in 1991 by Shouz and colleagues. The pregnant mother had low estrogen serum level and high androgen level in the third trimester along with signs of progressive virilization. Upon delivery, the female infant exhibited ambiguous genitalia. Aromatase activity of the placenta was approximately ten times less than the normal range.

== See also ==
- Aromatase excess syndrome
- Congenital estrogen deficiency
- Disorders of sex development
- Estrogen insensitivity syndrome
- Inborn errors of steroid metabolism
- Cytochrome P450 oxidoreductase deficiency
