= HAIR-AN syndrome =

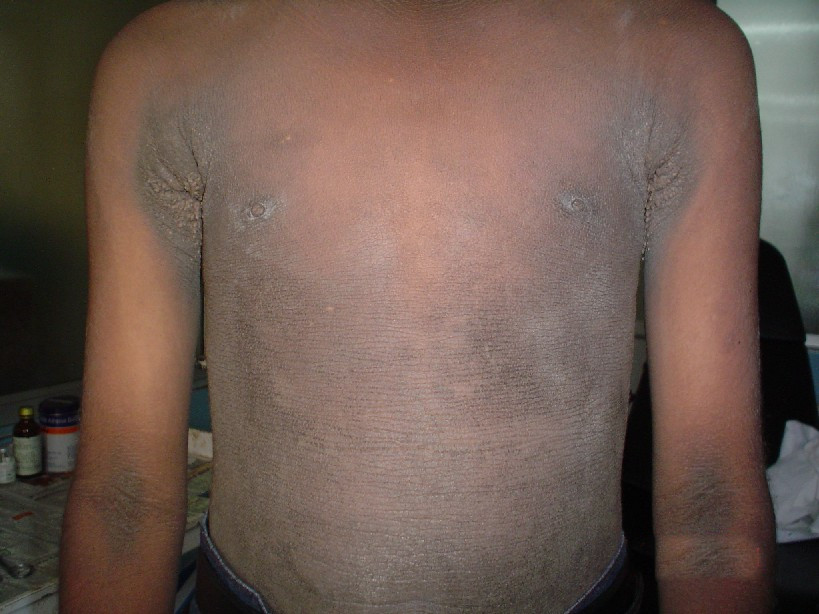
- Acanthosis nigricans

The HAIR-AN syndrome is a rare subtype of polyendocrine metabolic ovarian syndrome (PMOS) characterized by hyperandrogenism (HA), insulin resistance (IR) and acanthosis nigricans (AN). The symptoms of the HAIR-AN syndrome are largely due to severe insulin resistance, which can be secondary to blocking antibodies against the insulin receptor or genetically absent/reduced insulin receptor number/function. Insulin resistance leads to hyperinsulinemia which, in turn, leads to an excess production of androgen hormones by the ovaries. High levels of androgen hormones (hyperandrogenism) in females causes excessive hair growth, acne and irregular menstruation. Patients with both underlying mechanisms of insulin resistance may have more severe hyperandrogenism. Insulin resistance is also associated with diabetes, heart disease and excessive darkening of the skin (acanthosis nigricans)

== Signs and symptoms ==
Obesity is the chief symptom of HAIR-AN. In the majority of young women affected by HAIR-AN, hyperandrogenism leads to oily skin, acne, hirsutism, menstrual irregularities and, in some cases, androgenic alopecia, clitoromegaly, changes in muscle mass and deepening of the voice. Insulin resistance can be accompanied by normal or elevated levels of glucose. Symptoms of diabetes such as polydipsia, polyuria and weight loss may sometimes be present.

Features	Manifestations
Hyperandrogenism	Hirsutism of the face, chin, chest, perineum
	Alopecia (hair loss from the vertex or crown areas of the scalp; bitemporal hair loss less frequent)
	Male body habitus (muscularity)
	Acne
	Clitoromegaly
	Menstrual dysfunction (amenorrhea, infertility)
	Increased libido
Insulin resistance	Polydipsia, polyuria (symptoms of insulin resistance are often subclinical)
Acanthosis nigricans	Verrucous, velvety hyperpigmentation on nape of neck, vulva, axillae, groin, umbilicus, submammary regions; increased skin tags
Obesity	Increased waist-to-hip ratio (android appearance)

== Causes ==
The causes of the HAIR-AN syndrome are not fully understood. Some studies hypothesize that the HAIR-AN syndrome is caused by a combination of genetic and environmental factors. HAIR-AN is found in 1-3% women affected hyperandrogenism. Other studies have proposed the SAHA syndrome as a cause of the HAIR-AN syndrome.

== Diagnosis ==
The diagnosis of HAIR-AN is based on identifying the symptoms and correlating them to the known risk factors.

The severity of hirsutism which accompanies the HAIR-AN syndrome has been found to correlate to the activity of the stromal ovarian cells, as they are overstimulated by elevated insulin levels.

== Treatment ==
The treatment is based on addressing obesity, thus reducing insulin resistance and its undesired effects. Insulin resistance can be treated with metformin and may have a positive impact on reproductive function.

Pharmacological treatment by suppression of gonadotropin with estrogen-progesterone oral contraceptives can reduce the hyperandrogenism by decreasing LH (luteinizing hormone) levels. Even their sex hormone binding to globulin increase is also responsible for decreasing body's bio-availability of testosterone. Progestin treatment with desogestrel and norgestimate appears to have fewer androgenic side effects and may be safer to use in persons with abnormal lipid levels or hirsutism. Other proposed treatments include antiandrogenic medications, spironolactone (in combination with oral contraceptives to prevent menstrual cycle irregularities), flutamide, and the 5α-reductase inhibitor finasteride.

== See also ==
- Skin lesion
- List of cutaneous conditions
