= SAHA syndrome =

- Other names: Dermatological androgenization syndrome

SAHA syndrome is a medical syndrome characterized by seborrhoea, acne, hirsutism and alopecia, and was first described in 1982. It is frequently associated with polyendocrine metabolic ovarian syndrome, cystic mastitis, obesity, and infertility.

== See also ==
- Hyperandrogenism
- HAIR-AN syndrome
- List of cutaneous conditions
