= Progestin-induced virilization =

- Specialty: Gynaecology, endocrinology

Maternal use of androgens or high doses of certain weakly androgenic synthetic progestogens (progestins) structurally related to testosterone can masculinize (virilize) the vulva of a female fetus during susceptible times in pregnancy.

Some degree of fusion of the labioscrotal folds and urogenital folds and clitoral enlargement can occur if exposure occurs from the 8th through the 12th week of gestation, but only clitoral enlargement can occur if exposure occurs after the 12th week. This can in some cases result in ambiguous genitalia.

Fetal masculinization of the vulva is usually due to enzyme abnormalities involved in adrenal steroid biosynthesis, resulting in congenital adrenal hyperplasia (CAH); fetal masculinization of the vulva is much less frequently due to maternal use of androgenic steroids.

Fetal masculinization of the vulva due to maternal use of androgenic steroids is generally less advanced than that due to CAH, and unlike CAH, does not cause progressive virilization.

Affected females mature normally with normal fertility, there is almost total regression of the genital anomaly in cases of simple clitoral enlargement, and in even the most severe cases, surgical correction of labioscrotal fusion is relatively simple.

== Dosage ==
The incidence of fetal masculinization of the vulva varies with the drug and dosage.

=== Androgens ===
The only sex steroid currently utilized in women that can cause virilization of female fetuses when administered in usually administered doses is the androgen danazol, a derivative of ethisterone (ethinyltestosterone).

Fetal masculinization of the vulva has resulted from doses of danazol as low as 200 mg/day, whereas 800 mg/day is the usual initial dose when danazol is used to treat severe endometriosis.

=== Progestogens ===
In general, pregnane derivatives (e.g., progesterone, dydrogesterone, hydroxyprogesterone caproate, medroxyprogesterone acetate, megestrol acetate) do not virilize even in high dose; testosterone derivatives (ethisterone) and 19-nortestosterone (norethisterone, norethisterone acetate, etc.) generally virilize, but there are exceptions (e.g., noretynodrel, allylestrenol) that do not.

The only progestogens currently used during pregnancy (e.g., for luteal support in IVF protocols or for prevention of preterm birth in pregnant women with a history of at least one spontaneous preterm birth) are: progesterone, hydroxyprogesterone caproate, dydrogesterone, and allylestrenol.

Doses of 19-nortestosterones required for virilization are 10 to 20 mg/day, far in excess of those associated with inadvertent contraceptive exposure during pregnancy. Genital ambiguity due to progestin exposure in pregnancy is thus mostly a topic of historical concern.

== History ==
=== Androgens ===
The first drugs reported to cause fetal masculinization were the androgens methandriol and methyltestosterone in the mid-1950s.

On June 21, 1976, the FDA approved the androgen danazol (Danocrine), a derivative of ethisterone, for treatment of endometriosis, with a warning that its use in pregnancy is contraindicated because of the risk of masculinization of vulvas of female fetuses.

The first case report of fetal masculinization of the vulva of a female infant born to a mother inadvertently treated in pregnancy with danazol was published in 1981.

Between 1975 and 1990, the manufacturer of Danocrine, Winthrop Laboratories, received reports worldwide of 129 pregnant women exposed to danazol, with 94 completed pregnancies and the birth of 57 female infants – 23 (40%) of whom were virilized with a pattern of clitoromegaly, fused labia and urogenital sinus formation, with genital reconstructive surgery usually, but not always, required in childhood. It is likely that the true rate of occurrence is much less than 40%, as many cases with a normal outcome would not be reported. No genital anomalies were reported where danazol therapy was discontinued before the 8th week of pregnancy.

The warnings against use of danazol were progressively strengthened in the 1980s. In 1991, the FDA required a black box warning that use of danazol in pregnancy is contraindicated because exposure to danazol in utero may result in androgenic effects on the female fetus causing vulvar masculinization. The black box warning recommends a sensitive hCGβ-subunit pregnancy test immediately prior to starting danazol therapy and use of a non-hormonal method of contraception during therapy.

As of 2000, there had been published reports of fetal masculinization of the vulva in:

- 23 cases associated with danazol (all from inadvertent use from 1975 to 1990)
- 13 cases associated with methandriol (all from use in the 1950s and 1960s)
- 11 cases associated with methyltestosterone (all from use in the 1950s and 1960s)

=== Progestogens ===
==== Past use for prevention of miscarriage ====
In the 1940s, some studies suggested that progesterone could prevent threatened abortion and might prevent habitual abortion, but oral bioavailability of progesterone is low and injections of progesterone can be painful, so orally active progestins were tried beginning with ethisterone, followed by other progestins as they became available: noretynodrel (Enovid) and norethisterone (Norlutin) in 1957, medroxyprogesterone acetate (Provera) in 1959, norethisterone acetate (Norlutate) in 1961, and dydrogesterone (Duphaston) in 1962.

The first case reports of fetal masculinization of vulvas of female infants born to mothers treated in pregnancy with high-dose ethisterone and high-dose norethisterone (17α-ethinyl-19-nortestosterone) to prevent miscarriage were published in 1957 and 1958, respectively.

In a March 1960 JAMA article, pediatric endocrinologist Lawson Wilkins at Johns Hopkins reported on 34 cases of fetal masculinization of vulvas of female infants born from 1950 to 1959 to mothers treated with high-dose (20–250 mg/day) ethisterone to prevent miscarriage, and 35 cases of fetal masculinization of vulvas of female infants born from 1957 to 1959 to mothers treated with high-dose (10–40 mg/day) norethisterone to prevent miscarriage.

In 1961, Ciba and Parke-Davis added the reported association of ethisterone and norethisterone with masculinization of the vulva of the female fetus to the precautions section of their advertisements to physicians and physician prescribing information.

A clinical trial published in the October 1962 American Journal of Obstetrics and Gynecology reported fetal masculinization of the vulvas of 14 of 59 female infants (24%) born to mothers who began high-dose (10–40 mg/day) norethisterone treatment to prevent miscarriage in the first 12 weeks of pregnancy (11 infants had slight clitoral enlargement, 1 had marked clitoral enlargement, 2 infants had marked clitoral enlargement and partial fusion of the labioscrotal folds); fetal masculinization of the vulvas of 1 of 23 female infants born to mothers who began high-dose (10–40 mg/day) norethisterone treatment to prevent miscarriage after the 12th week of pregnancy (1 infant with slight clitoral enlargement was born to a mother who began norethisterone treatment in week 13).

In 1964, Parke-Davis revised the physician prescribing information for Norlutin (norethisterone) and Norlutate (norethisterone acetate) to remove their indications for use in infertility, habitual abortion and threatened abortion, and add pregnancy as a contraindication to their use because of the possibility of masculinization of vulvas of the female fetus.

In 1977, the FDA determined that there was no adequate evidence that progestogens (including progesterone, dydrogesterone, and 17α-hydroxyprogesterone caproate) were effective in treating threatened abortion or preventing habitual abortion and withdrew approval for those indications.

As of 2000, there had been published reports of fetal masculinization of the vulva in:

- 78 cases associated with ethisterone (all from use in the 1950s and early 1960s to prevent miscarriage)
- 81 cases associated with norethisterone (all from use in the late 1950s and early 1960s to prevent miscarriage)

==== Past FDA labeling requirements ====
On July 22, 1977, the FDA published a notice requiring a black box warning on all progestogen drugs (except contraceptives) to warn against their use during the first four months of pregnancy because of reports of non-genital birth defects.

On January 12, 1989, after determining that progestogens did not cause non-genital birth defects, the FDA published a notice revising the black box warning on all progestogen drugs (except contraceptives) to warn against their use during the first four months of pregnancy because of past reports of genital birth defects (an increased risk of hypospadias in male fetuses and mild virilization of vulvas in female fetuses).

On November 16, 1999, the FDA published a notice effective November 16, 2000 removing (after 22 years) the black box warning on all progestogen drugs because it was unwarranted based on scientific review of current data.
