= PPSh =

PPSh may refer to:

- Party of Labour of Albania, Partia e Punës e Shqipërisë, PPSh in Albanian
- PPSh-41, a Soviet World War II-era submachine gun with a drum or normal magazine
- PPS-43, a.k.a. PPS, a different Soviet World War II–era submachine gun
- Pseudovaginal perineoscrotal hypospadias
