= Estrogen insensitivity syndrome =

- Other names: EIS; Complete estrogen insensitivity syndrome; CEIS
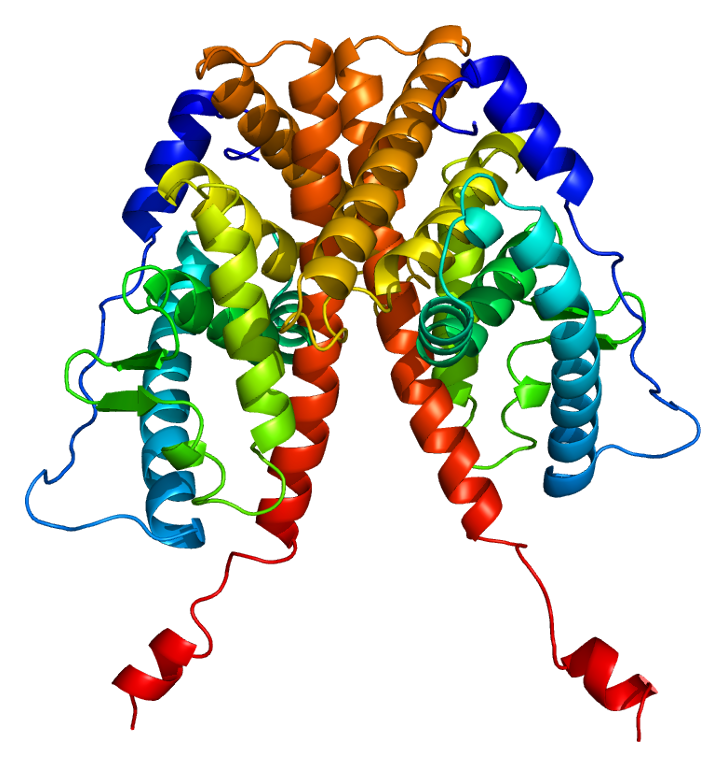
- EIS results when the function of the estrogen receptor alpha (ERα) is impaired. The ERα protein (pictured) mediates most of the effects of estrogens in the human body.
- Specialty: Endocrinology
- Frequency: 0.0001%

Estrogen insensitivity syndrome (EIS), or estrogen resistance, is a form of congenital estrogen deficiency or hypoestrogenism which is caused by a defective estrogen receptor (ER) – specifically, the estrogen receptor alpha (ERα) – that results in an inability of estrogen to mediate its biological effects in the body. Congenital estrogen deficiency can alternatively be caused by a defect in aromatase, the enzyme responsible for the biosynthesis of estrogens, a condition which is referred to as aromatase deficiency and is similar in symptomatology to EIS.

EIS is an extremely rare occurrence. As of 2016, there have been three published reports of EIS, involving a total of five individuals. The reports include a male case published in 1994, a female case published in 2013, and a familial case involving two sisters and a brother which was published in 2016.

EIS is analogous to androgen insensitivity syndrome (AIS), a condition in which the androgen receptor (AR) is defective and insensitive to androgens, such as testosterone and dihydrotestosterone (DHT). The functional opposite of EIS is hyperestrogenism, for instance that seen in aromatase excess syndrome.

== History ==
=== Male case ===
In 1994, a 28-year-old man was diagnosed with EIS after presenting to an orthopedic surgeon for correction of knock knees. He was fully masculinized. At 204 cm, he had tall stature. His epiphyses were unfused, and there was evidence of still-occurring slow linear growth (for comparison, his height at 16 years of age was 178 cm). He also had markedly delayed skeletal maturation (bone age 15 years), a severely undermineralized skeleton, evidence of increased bone resorption, and very early-onset osteoporosis. The genitalia, testes, and prostate of the patient were all normal and of normal size/volume. The sperm count of the patient was normal (25 million/mL; normal, >20 million/mL), but his sperm viability was low (18%; normal, >50%), indicating some degree of infertility. The patient also had early-onset temporal hair loss. He reported no history of gender dysphoria, considered himself to have strong heterosexual interests, and had normal sexual function, including morning erections and nocturnal emissions.

Follicle-stimulating hormone and luteinizing hormone levels were considerably elevated (30–33 mIU/mL and 34–37 mIU/mL, respectively) and estradiol and estrone levels were markedly elevated (145 pg/mL and 119–272 pg/mL, respectively), while testosterone levels were normal (445 ng/dL). Sex hormone-binding globulin levels were mildly elevated (6.0–10.0 nmol/L), while thyroxine-binding globulin, corticosteroid-binding globulin, and prolactin levels were all normal. Osteocalcin and bone-specific alkaline phosphatase levels were both substantially elevated (18.7–21.6 ng/mL and 33.3–35.9 ng/mL, respectively).

Treatment with up to very high doses of estradiol (fourteen 100-μg Estraderm patches per week) had no effect on any of his symptoms of hypoestrogenism, did not produce any estrogenic effects such as gynecomastia, and had no effect on any of his physiological parameters (e.g., hormone levels or bone parameters), suggesting a profile of complete estrogen insensitivity syndrome.

=== Female case ===
In 2013, an 18-year-old woman with EIS was reported. DNA sequencing revealed a homozygous mutation in ESR1, the gene that encodes the ERα. Within the ligand-binding domain, the neutral polar glutamine 375 was changed to a basic, polar histidine. An in vitro assay of ERα-dependent gene transcription found that the EC_{50} for transactivation had been reduced by 240-fold relative to normal, non-mutated ERα, indicating an extreme reduction in the activity of the receptor. Clinical signs suggested a profile of complete estrogen insensitivity syndrome with a resemblance to ERα knockout mice. The patient presented with delayed puberty, including an absence of breast development (Tanner stage I) and primary amenorrhea, as well as intermittent pelvic pain. Examination revealed markedly enlarged ovaries with multiple hemorrhagic cysts as the cause of the lower abdominal pain.

Estrogen levels were dramatically and persistently elevated (estradiol levels were 2,340 pg/mL, regarded as being about 10 times the normal level, and ranged from 750 to 3,500 pg/mL), gonadotropin levels were mildly elevated (follicle-stimulating hormone and luteinizing hormone levels were 6.7–19.1 mIU/mL and 5.8–13.2 mIU/mL, respectively), and testosterone levels were slightly elevated (33–88 ng/dL). Inhibin A levels were also markedly elevated. Sex hormone-binding globulin, corticosteroid-binding globulin, thyroxine-binding globulin, prolactin, and triglycerides, which are known to be elevated by estrogen, were all within normal ranges in spite of the extremely high levels of estrogen, and inhibin B levels were also normal. Her relatively mildly elevated levels of gonadotropins were attributed to retained negative feedback by progesterone as well as by her elevated levels of testosterone and inhibin A, although it was acknowledged that possible effects of estrogen mediated by other receptors such as ERβ could not be excluded.

The patient had a small uterus, with an endometrial stripe that could not be clearly identified. At the age of 15 years, 5 months, her bone age was 11 or 12 years, and at the age of 17 years, 8 months, her bone age was 13.5 years. Her bone mass was lower than expected for her age, and levels of osteocalcin and C-terminal telopeptide were both elevated, suggesting an increased rate of bone turnover. She was 162.6 cm tall, and her growth velocity indicated a lack of estrogen-induced growth spurt at puberty. The patient had normal pubic hair development (Tanner stage IV) and severe facial acne, which could both be attributed to testosterone. Her ovarian pathology was attributed to the elevated levels of gonadotropins. In addition to her absence of breast development and areolar enlargement, the patient also appeared to show minimal widening of the hips and a lack of subcutaneous fat deposition, which is in accordance with the established role of estrogen and ERα in the development of female secondary sexual characteristics.

Treatment of the patient with conjugated estrogens and high doses of estradiol had no effect. Although the authors of the paper considered her ERα to be essentially unresponsive to estrogen, they stated that they "[could not] exclude the possibility that some residual estrogen sensitivity could be present in some tissues", which is in accordance with the fact that the EC_{50} of her ERα had been reduced 240-fold but had not been abolished. Treatment with a progestin, norethisterone, reduced her estradiol concentrations to normal levels and decreased the size of her ovaries and the number of ovarian cysts, alleviating her hypothalamic-pituitary-gonadal axis hyperactivity and ovarian pathology.

=== Familial case ===
In 2016, a familial instance of EIS involving three siblings was reported. The affected individuals were a 25-year-old female, a 21-year-old female, and an 18-year-old male. The family was consanguineous, with the parents of the siblings being first cousins. The parents were both heterozygous for the causative mutation and were healthy and normal, while the three affected siblings were homozygous for the mutation, and a fourth sibling, an unaffected sister, was heterozygous. The fact that the heterozygous parents and heterozygous sister were unaffected indicates that the disorder is transmitted in an autosomal recessive manner and that a single normal allele is sufficient to achieve normal puberty and fertility, which is consistent with what has been observed in ERα knockout mice.

All three siblings presented with pubertal failure. Both of the sisters had no breast development (i.e., Tanner stage I), illustrating how the ERα is absolutely required for normal mammary gland development. The older sister was overweight (BMI 26.3) and had mild incidental adipomastia, or adipose tissue deposition in the breasts without true glandular tissue, a trait that is not indicative of pubertal development. The sisters had complete pubic hair maturation (i.e., Tanner stage V), while the brother had Tanner stage II pubic hair development and Tanner stage I gonadal maturation. The right testis of the brother was cryptorchid, while the left testis was severely hypoplastic, with a volume of less than 1 mL. Both of the sisters presented with primary amenorrhea and enlarged, multicystic ovaries, and the older sister had a small uterus and a thin endometrium. The older sister had chest acne, which could be attributed to hyperandrogenism (see below). All three siblings showed markedly delayed bone maturation for their chronological ages. The older sister was of normal height, while the younger sister was tall.

In all three siblings, estradiol levels were markedly elevated and gonadotropin levels were elevated. In the sisters, estradiol levels were extremely high, more than 50-fold greater than normal levels, while gonadotropin levels were elevated 3-fold above the normal range. Levels of progesterone, 17α-hydroxyprogesterone, androstenedione, testosterone, and dihydrotestosterone (DHT) were elevated in the sisters, while concentrations of adrenal steroids including cortisol, dehydroepiandrosterone (DHEA), 11β-hydroxyandrostenedione, 11-deoxycortisol, and 21-deoxycortisol were within normal ranges, ruling out congenital adrenal hyperplasia. Levels of sex hormone-binding globulin (SHBG) were very low, which can be attributed to the absence of hepatic actions of estrogen. In the older sister, anti-Müllerian hormone (AMH) levels were normal, while levels of inhibin A and inhibin B were significantly increased. In the brother, levels of AMH and inhibin B were low, in conjunction with the patient's low concentrations of testosterone. The low testosterone levels of the brother were probably related to his cryptorchidism, this symptom having not been previously reported in the earlier male case report of EIS. Consistent with the brother's phenotype, cryptorchidism has been described in ERα knockout mice. Because of the brother's low inhibin B levels, it was stated by the researchers that it was very likely that spermatogenesis would not occur in him. Impaired negative feedback by estrogen on the hypothalamic-pituitary-gonadal (HPG) axis would account for the elevated estradiol and gonadotropin levels in the siblings and for the ovarian enlargement and cyst formation in the sisters.

All three siblings were homozygous for a missense mutation in the fifth coding exon of the ESR1 gene. The mutation caused a change from guanine to adenine at complementary DNA nucleotide 1181 (c.1181G>A) in the gene, which resulted in the substitution of a histidine for an arginine at residue 394 (p.Arg394His) in the helix H5 of the ligand-binding domain (LBD) of the ERα protein. This is a critical residue that is completely conserved among species and in the androgen receptor (AR) and mineralocorticoid receptor (MR). Mutations involving the corresponding residue in the AR and MR have previously been associated with androgen insensitivity syndrome (AIS) and diminished sensitivity to mineralocorticoids, respectively.

Assays revealed that the mutated ERα showed strongly reduced transcriptional activity in response to stimulation by estradiol, with an ED_{50} that was approximately 65-fold greater than that of normal/wild-type ERα. In the normal ERα, estradiol is anchored in the binding pocket of the receptor by three hydrogen bonds; the C3 and C17 hydroxyl groups of estradiol are anchored by the Glu353 and Arg394, and His524 residues of the ERα protein, respectively. In the mutated ERα, the His394 residue is unable to properly anchor estradiol, which results in the dramatically reduced sensitivity and response of the receptor to estradiol relative to the normal ERα. A group of other ERα agonists that included ethinylestradiol, diethylstilbestrol, tamoxifen, clomifene, and raloxifene were tested in their ability to promote transcriptional activity of the mutated ERα, but none of them were found to be more efficacious than estradiol in activating the mutated receptor and hence in overcoming the estrogen insensitivity of the siblings.

As the sisters had very high, supraphysiological levels of circulating estradiol, the authors cautioned that it could not be ruled out that estradiol may have exerted some functional influence on their phenotypes via signaling through the ERβ and GPER (i.e., that not all of the observed phenotypes may have simply been due to loss of ERα signaling). Moreover, the authors noted that this might partially explain the variability in the phenotypes.

=== Further cases ===
Two more cases of EIS in sisters were reported in 2022.

== Research ==
EIS can be experimentally induced in animals via knockout of the ER. In these so-called ERKO mice, different ERs can be disabled allowing to study the role of these receptors. ERKO mice show development of the respective female or male reproductive systems, and male and female αERKO mice are infertile, βERKO males are fertile while females are subfertile, male and female double αERKO and βERKO mice are infertile. The uterus and mammary glands are hypoplastic and do not respond to exogenous stimulation by estrogens. Males are infertile with atrophy in the testes. Bone age is delayed and bones are more brittle. Variations in these patterns can be achieved by selectively disabling the ERα or ERβ.

The following sections are an extensive though partial/incomplete list of deficits observed in ERKO mice.

=== αERKO mice ===
==== Females ====
- Estradiol and LH levels are dramatically elevated due to loss of negative feedback by estradiol on the HPG axis. FSH levels, in contrast, are normal. Testosterone levels are also substantially elevated. Prolactin levels are decreased by 5-fold, which is due to a loss of its estradiol-induced secretion from the anterior pituitary.
- The uterus and endometrium show hypoplasia and hypotrophy, respectively, and the vagina is atrophic. The oviduct is normal. The ovary is normal until sexual maturity, at which point there is complete anovulation and the ovaries become enlarged, hemorrhagic, and cystic. Because there is complete anovulation, female αERKO mice are infertile. The ovarian phenotype closely resembles that of polyendocrine metabolic ovarian syndrome (PMOS) in humans. It is caused by chronic exposure to abnormally high levels of LH. By 18 months of age, there is a 30 to 40% incidence of ovarian tumors.
- The mammary gland is normal until puberty, at which point there is a complete absence of pubertal development and the gland remains in a prepubertal state.
- Body weight and body fat are increased. There are signs of insulin resistance, as in PMOS in humans.
- Due to the substantially elevated testosterone levels, there is hyperandrogenism, including masculinization of the preputial glands. In addition, female αERKO mice exhibit behavior that is similar to that of males in terms of parental, aggressive, and sexual activities. There is a complete lack of sexual receptivity, measured as lordosis behavior. There are significant deficits in parental behavior, including a tendency toward infanticide, and aggressive behavior is increased.

==== Males ====
- LH and testosterone levels are both increased 2-fold due to loss of negative feedback by estradiol on the HPG axis.
- The testes develop relatively normally initially, but are slightly smaller than normal and possess various defects. By 20 weeks, the weights of the testes, epididymis, and vas deferens are significantly decreased relative to those of normal mice. However, there is a severe testicular phenotype with age, such that the testes are completely atrophied by 150 days of age. Also, the testes show Leydig cell hyperplasia, which is due to the increased levels of LH and intratesticular testosterone. Further, there is a greater incidence of cryptorchidism (undescended/retracted testes).
- There is complete infertility, which is due both to testicular defects and to severely compromised normal sexual behavior (see below). Males can produce viable sperm, but there are severe deficits in both spermatogenesis and sperm function, the latter rendering produced sperm ineffective. Sperm counts are significantly reduced, at 55% of those of normal mice, and further diminish with age, at 13% of those of normal mice by 16 weeks of age. There are deficits in sperm motility, an increased incidence of sperm defects (specifically, sperm heads separated from the flagellum (tail)), and a complete inability of sperm to fertilize oocytes (assessed in vitro).
- There are no obvious abnormalities in the male accessory glands, including the prostate gland, bulbourethral glands, coagulating gland, and seminal vesicles. However, there is a significant increase in weight of the seminal vesicles/coagulating gland that becomes more apparent with age, which is likely due to elevated testosterone levels.
- Aggressive behavior is dramatically reduced, whereas parental behavior, in terms of infanticide, is relatively normal. There is little effect on sexual behavior in terms of mounting and sexual attraction to females. However, there is an almost complete lack of intromission and ejaculation, in spite of the relatively normal mounting rate. This contributes to infertility.

=== βERKO mice ===
==== Females ====
- The uterus, vagina, and oviducts are normal. The ovary is normal prior to puberty, and there is still no gross aberrant phenotype during adulthood. However, there is partial anovulation and subfertility, which is due to ovarian defects, namely compromised follicular maturation via loss of estradiol signaling in ovarian granulosa cells.
- The mammary gland appears to be normal.
- Body weight and fat distribution appear to be normal.
- Increased anxiety-like behavior is seen. In addition, the antidepressant-like effects of exogenous estradiol in the forced swim test are lost.

==== Males ====
- Fertility is full and normal, with a lack of relevant phenotypes observed.
- The male accessory glands, including the prostate gland, bulbourethral glands, coagulating gland, and seminal vesicles, all seem to be normal. However, there is an increased incidence of prostate hyperplasia with age.
- Body weight and fat distribution appear to be normal.
- There is a lack of grossly aberrant behavioral phenotypes, including in regards to sexual behavior. However, increased aggressive behavior is observed.

=== GPERKO mice ===
GPER knockout mice have also been generated, and exhibit obesity, cardiovascular dysfunction, insulin resistance, glucose intolerance, differences in mammary carcinogenesis and metastasis, and differences in central nervous system function.

== Androgen insensitivity syndrome ==
In contrast to EIS, androgen insensitivity syndrome (AIS), a condition in which the androgen receptor (AR) is defective, is relatively common. This can be explained by the genetics of each syndrome. AIS is an X-linked recessive condition and thus carried over, by females, into future generations (although the most severe form, complete androgen insensitivity syndrome (CAIS), results in sterility, and hence cannot be passed on to offspring). EIS is not compatible with reproduction, thus each occurrence in humans would have to be a de novo mutation and is not transmitted to offspring.
