= Hypergonadism =

Endocrine disease

Hypergonadism is a condition where there is a hyperfunction of the gonads. It can manifest as precocious puberty, and is caused by abnormally high levels of testosterone or estrogen, crucial hormones for sexual development. In some cases, it may be caused by a tumor, which can be malignant, but is more commonly benign. Anabolic steroids may also be a major cause of high androgen and estrogen functional activity. Other possible causes include head injuries and brain inflammatory diseases. Hypergonadism may contribute to symptoms such as precocious puberty and abnormal facial hair growth in females.

== Symptoms ==
Men and women exhibit different symptoms for hypergonadism. A few of the symptoms that men can experience are increased sex drive, early balding, excessive muscle mass, and acne. Women can have symptoms, such as increased growth of facial hair, deepened voice, coarse body hair, and an irregular menstrual cycle.

== See also ==
- Hypergonadotropic hypergonadism
- Hyperandrogenism and hyperestrogenism
- Hypothalamus, pituitary gland, and HPG axis
- GnRH and gonadotropins (FSH and LH)
- Hypogonadism (hypoandrogenism and hypoestrogenism)
