= Cancer (disambiguation) =

Cancer is a large class of malignant diseases.

Cancer may also refer to:

== People with the surname ==
- Dinah Cancer (born 1960), American punk rock musician
- Luis Cáncer (1500–1549), Spanish Dominican missionary
- Jerónimo de Cáncer (c. 1599 – 1655), Spanish playwright

== Astronomy and astrology ==
- Cancer (astrology), an astrological sign
- Cancer (Chinese astronomy), a constellation in Chinese astronomy
- Cancer (constellation), a constellation in astronomy

== Arts, entertainment, and media ==
=== Music ===
- Cancer (band), a British death metal band
- Cancer (Confession album)
- Cancer (My Disco album)
- Cancer (Showbread album)
- "Cancer" (song), a song by My Chemical Romance
- "Cancer", a song by Filter from Title of Record
- "Cancer", a song by Joe Jackson from Night and Day
- "Cancer", a song by Sick Puppies from Dressed Up as Life
- "Cancer", a song by Subhumans from Reasons for Existence
- "Cancer", a song by The Devil Wears Prada from Color Decay

=== Other uses in arts, entertainment, and media ===
- Cancer (comics), a character in the Marvel Universe
- Cancer (film), a 2015 American documentary film
- Cancer (journal), an academic journal about the disease
- Cancer (Transformers), a character in the Transformers universes

== Other uses ==
- Cancer (genus), a genus of crab
- Cancer (mythology), a giant crab in Greek mythology
- CANCER, an electronic circuit simulator and predecessor of SPICE

== See also ==
- 55 Cancri, a star system in which NASA has discovered five planets
- Kancer, a fictional character from DC Comics
- Kansar, an Indian dessert
- Tropic of Cancer (disambiguation)
- Tumour
- Malignant (disambiguation)
