= Transient masculinization =

Biological phenomena found in some species

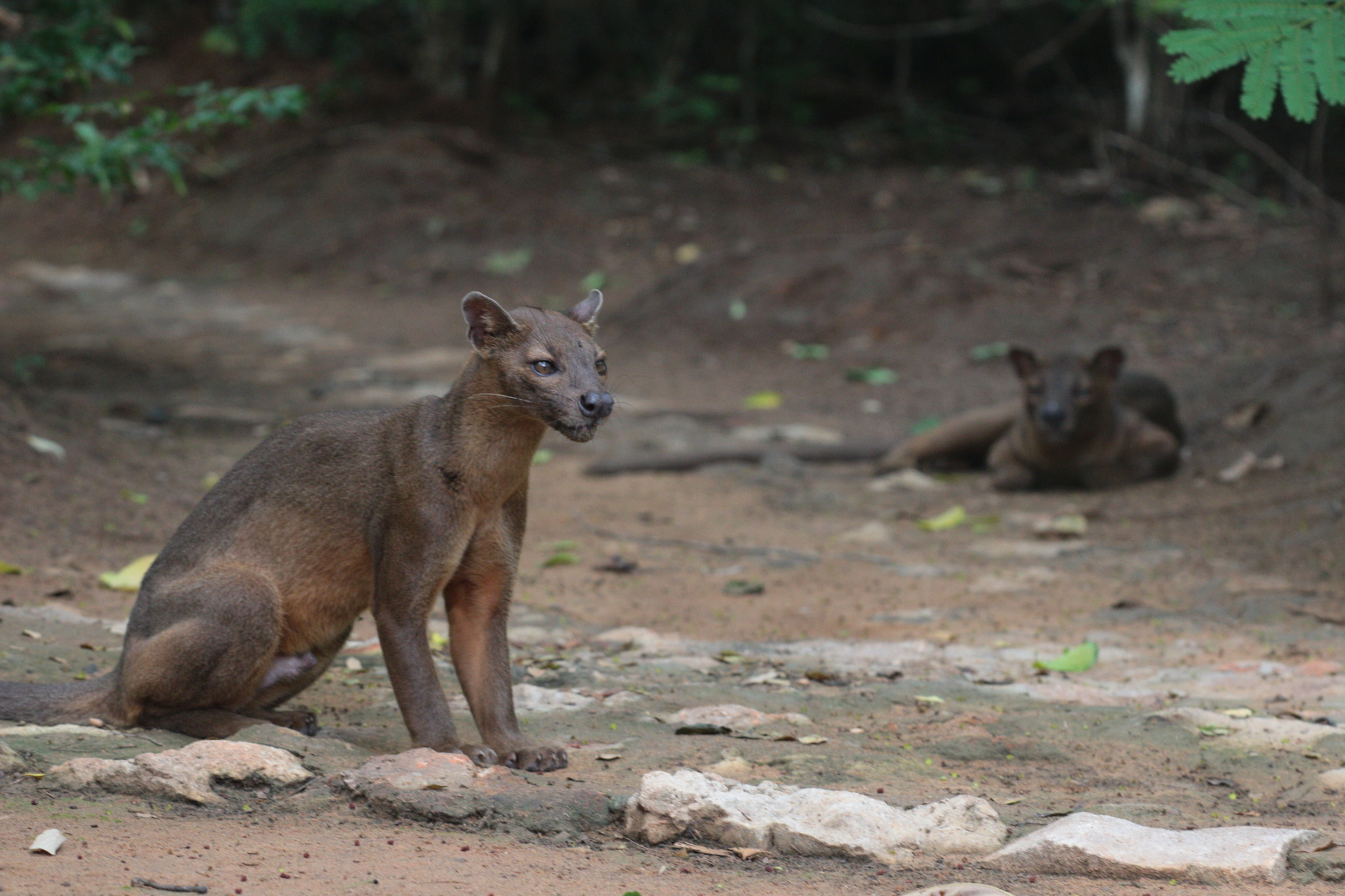
A fossa (Cryptoprocta ferox) in Madagascar. The fossa is the first described mammal to display transient masculinization.

Transient masculinization (or transient virilization) is a biological phenomenon in which female individuals of certain species temporarily exhibit physical or behavioral traits typically associated with males. Unlike permanent masculinization, which results in lifelong male-like characteristics, transient masculinization is limited to specific developmental stages or life events and often regresses over time. These traits may include altered genital morphology, increased androgen levels, or male-typical behaviors that serve adaptive purposes within specific ecological and social contexts.

Transient masculinization is distinct from other forms of sexual dimorphism or masculinization and has been observed in a small but ecologically diverse range of species. Studying this phenomenon sheds light on the complex interplay between hormones, behavior, and evolutionary pressures shaping sex-specific traits.

The fossa (Cryptoprocta ferox), a carnivorous mammal endemic to Madagascar, is a well-documented example of transient masculinization. Juvenile female fossas develop masculinised genitalia, such as an enlarged clitoris resembling a penis, which diminishes as they reach sexual maturity. This phenomenon is hypothesized to reduce male harassment during vulnerable developmental stages, among other potential benefits.

== Biological mechanisms ==
Transient masculinization is driven by complex hormonal processes that result in temporary expression of male-typical physical or behavioral traits in females. The phenomenon is primarily mediated by the endocrine system, particularly the secretion and regulation of androgens such as testosterone. These hormones influence the development of masculinised traits during specific life stages or contexts, and their effects diminish when hormonal levels subside, or regulatory mechanisms change.

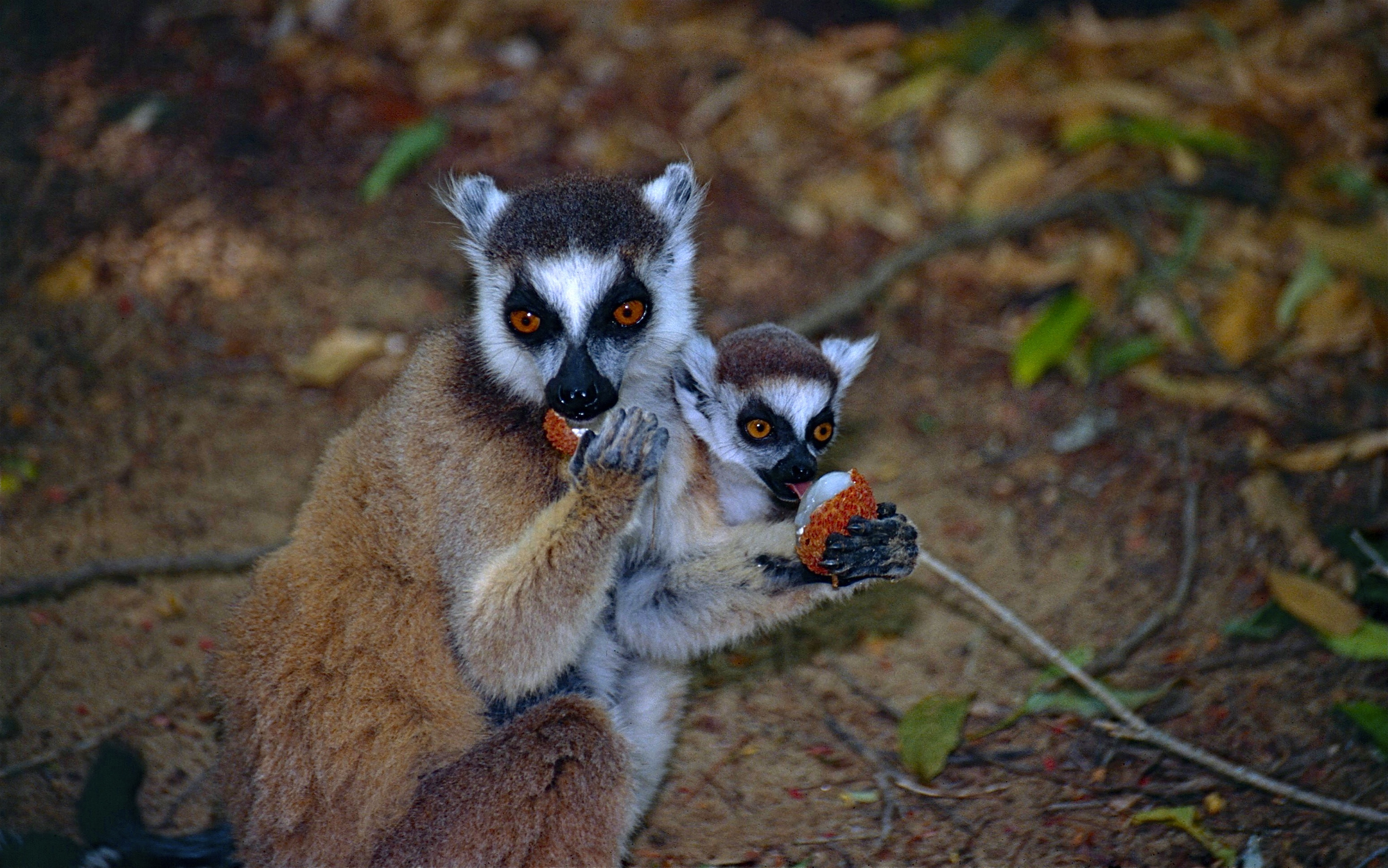
Ring-tailed lemur (Lemur catta) female and young feasting on litchis. The ring-tailed lemur is also hypothesized to be a mammal that experiences transient masculinization, specifically during the breeding season.

Androgens, such as testosterone and dihydrotestosterone (DHT), play a pivotal role in masculinization. During transient masculinization, elevated androgen levels are observed in females during critical developmental windows. For instance, in juvenile female fossas (Cryptoprocta ferox), increased androgen levels drive the development of an enlarged clitoris and scrotum-like structures, which regress as androgen levels decline with maturity.

Other species, such as ring-tailed lemurs (Lemur catta), demonstrate transient increases in androgen levels during specific reproductive stages, influencing behaviors like aggression and dominance. These fluctuations are tightly regulated to ensure that masculinized traits do not interfere with reproductive capacity or other female-specific roles. Transient masculinization typically occurs during juvenile stages or limited periods in adulthood. The timing is critical for the functional significance of these traits. For example:

- In fossas, masculinization during juvenile stages may reduce male harassment, giving young females a developmental advantage.
- In other species, transient masculinization during reproductive stages can enhance competitive behaviors or social dominance in females.

Unlike permanent masculinization, transient masculinization is reversible. The traits regress as hormonal levels return to baseline or as the organism transitions to a new life stage. This reversibility is believed to involve shifts in the sensitivity of androgen receptors, as well as changes in the synthesis and metabolism of androgens. Comparisons with species exhibiting permanent masculinization, such as spotted hyenas, reveal key differences. In transiently masculinised species, androgen exposure is temporary and typically does not involve structural changes to the ovaries or long-term suppression of female reproductive function. These differences suggest that transient masculinization is an adaptive, flexible response to specific ecological or social pressures.

== Mammalian examples ==
Transient masculinization has been documented in a small group of species, with the fossa being the most extensively studied. The fossa, a carnivorous mammal endemic to Madagascar, provides one of the clearest examples of transient masculinization. Juvenile female fossas exhibit masculinised genitalia, including an enlarged clitoris supported by an os clitoridis (a bony structure) and scrotum-like swellings. These traits regress as the individuals approach sexual maturity, at which point the clitoris shrinks, and the scrotum-like swellings flatten.

The adaptive function of this transient masculinization remains under study. One hypothesis suggests that it reduces sexual harassment from adult males, as masculinised traits may cause young females to be mistaken for males. This could provide developmental protection during a vulnerable life stage.

=== Ring-tailed lemur (Lemur catta) ===
In ring-tailed lemurs, transient masculinization is evident in seasonal fluctuations of androgen levels in females, particularly during breeding seasons. Elevated androgens correlate with increased aggression and dominance behaviors, which may enhance access to resources or mates. Unlike permanent masculinization, these traits are hormonally mediated and dissipate after the breeding season.

== Evolutionary significance ==
Transient masculinization, although rare, has important evolutionary and ecological implications in species where it occurs. It is thought to serve adaptive functions related to social dynamics, reproductive success, and survival. The phenomenon provides insight into the flexible nature of sexual dimorphism and how organisms can modulate traits in response to ecological pressures. Some researchers suggest that transient masculinization could represent an evolutionary trade-off between reproductive success and survival. By temporarily displaying male-like traits, females may avoid predation or social conflict, but they might also risk reduced mate attraction or reproductive success. Such trade-offs underscore the complex interplay between evolutionary pressures on both sexes and the adaptive strategies that evolve as a response to these pressures. Below are key hypotheses regarding the evolutionary significance of transient masculinization:

=== Reduction in harassment ===
One of the leading hypotheses for transient masculinization is that it reduces harassment from adult males around mating. In species like the fossa, juvenile females exhibit masculinised genitalia, which may cause confusion in adult males, leading them to mistake the females for males. This misidentification can help young females avoid unwanted mating attempts and aggression during vulnerable life stages. The regression of masculinised traits with age ensures that the female can later engage in reproduction without hindrance.

=== Increased social fitness ===
Transient masculinization may also enhance a female's ability to compete for resources or mates. In species like the ring-tailed lemur and meerkats (Suricata suricatta), transient masculinization in the form of increased aggression or dominance behaviors may similarly prevent females from being marginalized in social hierarchies. This could grant female lemurs greater access to resources and mates. During breeding seasons, these enhanced traits might facilitate access to high-quality mates, ensuring reproductive success. This temporary masculinization is often regulated to ensure that it does not disrupt the female's overall reproductive health.

=== Flexibility in social systems ===
Transient masculinization may reflect the adaptive flexibility of sex-specific traits within social systems. The ability to exhibit male-typical traits temporarily, without permanent changes to reproductive anatomy or function, provides a flexible strategy to navigate environmental or social pressures. For example, in species where female competition is seasonal, the ability to display male-like traits only when needed (e.g., during periods of high competition) allows females to balance their role in reproduction with social dominance.

This flexibility may be especially important in species with fluctuating social dynamics or in environments where the risk of male harassment is higher during certain times.

== Comparisons with permanent masculinization ==
While transient masculinization involves the temporary expression of male-typical traits in females, permanent masculinization refers to long-lasting or irreversible morphological and/or behavioral changes in females that align them more closely with males. The key differences between these two phenomena relate to their hormonal regulation, evolutionary significance, and impact on female reproductive health. Below are the main contrasts between transient and permanent masculinization:

=== Duration and reversibility ===
The most significant distinction between transient and permanent masculinization is the duration of the masculinised traits. Transient masculinization is temporary, with masculinised characteristics often regressing as hormone levels return to baseline or as the individual matures. For example, in the fossa, juvenile females exhibit masculinised genitalia, which shrink as they approach sexual maturity, while in species like ring-tailed lemurs, transient masculinization occurs during specific seasonal periods or reproductive windows.

In contrast, permanent masculinization results in irreversible changes, such as in the case of the spotted hyena (Crocuta crocuta), where females possess masculinised genitalia throughout their lives, including a large, pseudopenis-like clitoris. These structural changes are maintained across all life stages.

=== Hormonal regulation ===
Both forms of masculinization are driven by androgens such as testosterone, but the regulation and timing of androgen exposure differ. In transient masculinization, androgen levels rise temporarily during specific developmental periods or reproductive stages. For example, during the juvenile period, fossa females experience a surge in androgens, causing masculinised genitalia and behavior, but these levels drop as the individual matures. Similarly, in ring-tailed lemurs, transient masculinization correlates with seasonal hormonal fluctuations.

In contrast, permanent masculinization typically results from prolonged or consistent exposure to high androgen levels throughout the individual's life. In spotted hyenas, females are exposed to elevated androgens in utero and during early development, leading to the permanent formation of male-like genitalia. This long-term exposure to androgens may also affect the development of other male-typical behaviors such as dominance or aggression.

=== Evolutionary and ecological functions ===
While both forms of masculinization serve evolutionary functions, they do so in distinct ways. Transient masculinization may primarily be a response to social or environmental pressures. Permanent masculinization, on the other hand, typically evolves when consistent selective pressures favor the persistence of male-typical traits in females. In the case of spotted hyenas, the development of a pseudopenis is thought to play a role in dominance hierarchies, where females exert control over the social structure. Permanent masculinization also plays a role in reproduction, as hyena females must "give birth" through their pseudopenis, a trait that is closely linked to their reproductive physiology.

== Research history ==
The study of transient masculinization in mammals is relatively recent, with its documentation expanding primarily in the last few decades. Although sexual dimorphism in mammals has been well established, the phenomenon of transient masculinization remained largely unexplored until the late 20th and early 21st centuries. Researchers have identified both ecological and hormonal mechanisms underlying these traits, though the full scope and evolutionary significance are still areas of active research.

The first significant documentation of transient masculinization in a mammal came from the study of the fossa. In 2002, a study observed that juvenile female fossas exhibit masculinised genitalia, including an enlarged clitoris and scrotum-like swellings, which regressed as the female's approach sexual maturity. Their research provided the first clear evidence of transient masculinization in mammals and prompted further inquiries into its adaptive significance.

After the discovery of transient masculinization among the fossa, a number of hypotheses emerged to explain its function. These theories largely revolved around sexual selection, social dynamics, and reproductive strategies. The concept that transient masculinization could serve as a form of protection against sexual harassment or aggression from adult males gained traction, particularly in species with pronounced sexual dimorphism. In species like the fossa and ring-tailed lemurs, the hypothesis that masculinised traits temporarily reduce male attention during vulnerable juvenile stages became a central focus for future studies.

Research also began to focus on the role of hormonal fluctuations in regulating these temporary masculinised traits. It was recognized that androgen levels, such as testosterone, likely play a key role in driving the development of masculinised characteristics, but only during specific periods of development or reproduction.

In the years following the fossa study, researchers expanded the scope of transient masculinization beyond the fossa to other species. Comparative studies involving species like meerkats and ring-tailed lemurs have provided further insights into the hormonal and social factors influencing this phenomenon. These studies have allowed scientists to investigate whether transient masculinization is a widespread strategy in the animal kingdom or if it is an uncommon adaptive trait.

The development of more sophisticated endocrine assays, improved field observation techniques, and advances in molecular biology have allowed researchers to test the hormonal underpinnings of transient masculinization in greater detail. In particular, studies on female spotted hyenas have shed light on the evolutionary advantages of both permanent and transient masculinization in response to social competition and reproductive dynamics.

== See also ==
- Sexual dimorphism
- Sexual selection
- Evolution of sexual reproduction
- Virilization
- Comparative endocrinology
