= Güevedoce =

Local name of a type of intersexuality in the Dominican Republic

In and around Las Salinas de Barahona of the Dominican Republic, güevedoces are intersex people who experience development of male external genitalia during puberty rather than within the womb, appearing to be female in early age. This is the result of a genetic trait that can exist both in people who are genotypically male and people who are genotypically female; however, only genotypically male people (those with XY chromosomes) experience the later-than-typical development of male genitals. Because of this, they are also the only ones known as güevedoces. Once at puberty, they are recognized by their communities as being part of a sex category that is neither male nor female.

== Etymology ==
The word güevedoce, meaning "testicles/penis at twelve", comes from Dominican Spanish. The first part of the word ("güeve") comes from güevo (also spelled güebo), which is slang for male genitalia and is derived from huevo ("egg"); the second part of the word ("doce") means "twelve". Güevedoces may also be referred to as machihembras in their communities.

== Biochemistry and biology ==
The güevedoces' belated development of external genitalia is due to a trait that causes the body to not produce enough of a hormone necessary for that development while in the womb. Once at puberty, the body is able to produce enough of the necessary hormones, but this is true only for people who are genotypically male. People who are genotypically female may have this trait as well, but as they do not develop male genitalia, they exhibit it in less noticeable ways.

The first scientific investigations of güevedoces occurred in the 1970s, when Julianne Imperato-McGinley, an endocrinologist from Cornell University, traveled to Las Salinas. While they are common around Las Salinas, as a result of early research, güevedoces have less of a presence than they used to. Many were taken to the United States, and most of them did not return to the Dominican Republic.

== In society ==
In the Las Salinas area, around 1 in 90 genotypically male people are güevedoces. This is so common that they are readily accepted in their communities, although some güevedoce children may face teasing from other children at first because of a sudden change in presentation. While being recognized as fitting into a sex category that is neither male nor female, and experiencing related ambivalent gender socialization, there are generally two recognized gender roles for güevedoces to fill in their communities—that of a man and that of a woman.

Güevedoces typically adopt men's social roles and identities, but it is not unheard of for them to continue with those of women. Some güevedoces that identify as women may also choose to undergo gender-affirming surgery. Generally, those who identify as men most likely also identify as heterosexual.

== See also ==
- Gender system
- 5α-Reductase deficiency
