= Defeminization =

In developmental biology and zoology, defeminization is an aspect of the process of sexual differentiation by which a potential female-specific structure, function, or behavior is changed by one of the processes of male development.

== See also ==
- Sexual differentiation
- Defeminization and masculinization
- Virilization
- Feminization
