= Hyperandrogenism =

Excess androgens in the body

- Other names: Androgen excess
- Pronunciation: /ˌhaɪpərænˈdrɒdʒənɪzəm/ HY-pər-an-DROJ-ə-niz-əm
- Specialty: Endocrinology
- Symptoms: Acne, hair loss on scalp, increased body or facial hair, hypertension, infrequent or absent menstruation
- Causes: Polyendocrine metabolic ovarian syndrome, adrenal hyperplasia, Cushing's disease, cancer
- Diagnostic method: Blood tests, ultrasound
- Treatment: Birth control pills, cyproterone acetate, spironolactone, antiandrogen
- Frequency: 5% in reproductive age women

Hyperandrogenism is a medical condition characterized by high levels of androgens. It is more common in women than men. Symptoms of hyperandrogenism may include acne, seborrhea, hair loss on the scalp, increased body or facial hair, and infrequent or absent menstruation. Complications may include high blood cholesterol and diabetes. It occurs in approximately 5% of women of reproductive age.

Polyendocrine metabolic ovarian syndrome accounts for about 70% of hyperandrogenism cases. Other causes include Congenital adrenal hyperplasia, insulin resistance, hyperprolactinemia, Cushing's disease, certain types of cancers, and certain medications. Diagnosis often involves blood tests for testosterone, 17-hydroxyprogesterone, and prolactin, as well as a pelvic ultrasound.

Treatment depends on the underlying cause. Symptoms of hyperandrogenism can be treated with birth control pills or antiandrogens, such as cyproterone acetate or spironolactone. Other measures may include hair removal techniques.

The earliest known description of the condition is attributed to Hippocrates.

In 2011, the International Association of Athletics Federations (now World Athletics) and IOC (International Olympic Committee) released statements restricting the eligibility of female athletes with high testosterone, whether through hyperandrogenism or as a result of a difference in sex development (DSD). These regulations were referred to by both bodies as hyperandrogenism regulations and have led to athletes with DSDs being described as having hyperandrogenism. They were revised in 2019 to focus more specifically on DSDs.

== Signs and symptoms ==
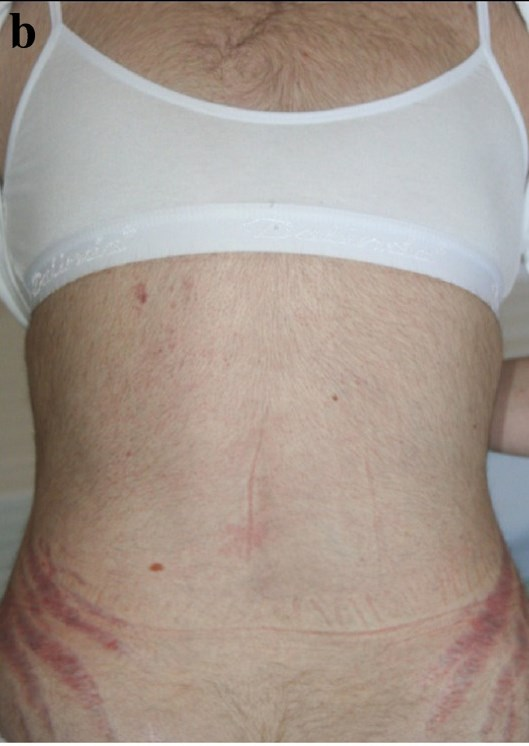
A woman with hirsutism from increased androgen exposure

Hyperandrogenism affects 5–10% of women of reproductive age. Hyperandrogenism can affect both men and women but is more noticeable in women since elevated levels of androgens in women may facilitate virilization. Because hyperandrogenism is characterized by elevated male sex hormone levels, symptoms of hyperandrogenism in men are often negligible. Hyperandrogenism in women is typically diagnosed in late adolescence with a medical evaluation. The medical evaluation usually consists of a pelvic exam, observation of external symptoms, and a blood test measuring androgen levels. Symptoms may include the following:

- Hirsutism (male-pattern hair growth)
- Alopecia (balding)
- Masculine appearance
- Hidradenitis suppurativa
- Polyendocrine metabolic ovarian syndrome
- Oligomenorrhea (menstrual irregularities)
- Acne
- Obesity
- Infertility
- Deepening of voice
- Oily skin
- Seborrhea (skin inflammation)
- Libido (increased sex drive)
- Type 2 diabetes

=== Women ===
Hyperandrogenism, especially high levels of testosterone, can cause serious adverse effects if left untreated. High testosterone levels are associated with other health conditions such as obesity, hypertension, amenorrhea (cessation of menstrual cycles), and ovulatory dysfunction, which can lead to infertility. Prominent signs of hyperandrogenism are hirsutism (unwanted growth of hair, especially in the abdominal region and on the back), adult acne, deepening of the voice, and alopecia (balding).

Hyperandrogenism has also been observed to increase insulin tolerance, which can lead to type two diabetes and dyslipidemia, such as high cholesterol. These effects may have psychological impacts, sometimes leading to social anxiety and depression, especially in adolescent girls and young women. Paired with obesity and hirsutism, it can cause the individual to have low self-esteem.

=== Men ===
Administration of high-dose testosterone in men over a course of weeks can cause an increase in aggression and hypomanic symptoms, though these were seen in only a minority of subjects. Acute high-dose anabolic-androgenic steroid administration in males attenuates endogenous sex hormone production and affects the thyroid hormone axis. Effects on mood and aggression observed during high-dose anabolic-androgenic steroid administration may occur secondarily to hormonal changes. Many of the same signs and symptoms that are seen in women, such as alopecia and acne, may also be found in men, as well as possible differences in metabolic health outcomes. Enlargement of the prostate may also occur.

== Causes ==
While hyperandrogenism in women can be caused by external factors, it can also appear spontaneously.

=== Polyendocrine metabolic ovarian syndrome ===
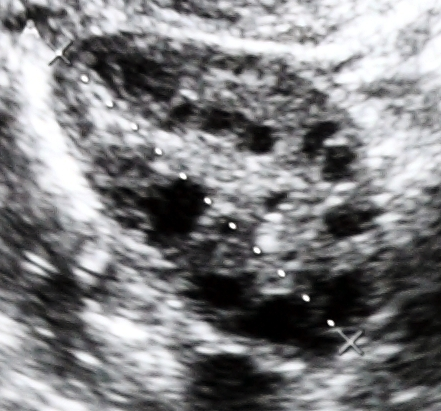
Ultrasound of a polycystic ovary. Each of the dark circles represents a fluid-filled cyst.

Polyendocrine metabolic ovarian syndrome (PMOS) is an endocrine disorder characterized by an excess of androgens produced by the ovaries. It is estimated that approximately 90% of women with PMOS demonstrate hypersecretion of these hormones. The cause of this condition is unknown. Speculations include genetic predisposition; however, the gene or genes responsible for this remain unidentified. The condition may have a hereditary basis. Other possible causes include elevated insulin production. Most cases of PMOS involve insulin resistance. It is thought that adipose tissue dysfunction plays a role in the insulin resistance seen in PMOS. Insulin can induce excess testosterone secretion from the ovaries. A complication associated with polyendocrine metabolic ovarian syndrome is high cholesterol, which is treated with statins. In a meta-analysis, atorvastatin was shown to decrease androgen concentrations in people with hyperandrogenism.

Elevated insulin leads to lower production of sex hormone binding globulin (SHBG), a regulatory glycoprotein that suppresses the function of androgens. High blood levels of insulin also work in conjunction with ovarian sensitivity to insulin to cause hyperandrogenemia, the primary symptom of PMOS. Obese individuals may be more biologically inclined to PMOS due to markedly higher insulin. This hormonal imbalance can lead to chronic anovulation, in which the ovaries fail to release mature eggs. These cases of ovulatory dysfunction are linked to infertility and menstrual disturbances. A post hoc analysis from a randomized, placebo-controlled, multi-centre study carried out at 11 secondary care centres, as well as a longitudinal single-centre study on pregnant women in Norway, also determined that metformin had no effect on maternal androgens in pregnancies occurring in the setting of PMOS.

One systemic review suggested that polymorphisms in the vitamin D receptor gene are associated with the prognosis of polyendocrine metabolic ovarian syndrome, though this is based on small sample sizes and is debated. Studies have shown benefits for vitamin D supplementation in women with vitamin D deficiency and PMOS.

Hyperinsulinemia can increase the production of androgens in the ovaries. One context in which this occurs is HAIR-AN syndrome, a rare subtype of PMOS.

=== Hyperthecosis and hyperinsulinemia ===
Hyperthecosis occurs when the cells of the ovarian stroma transition from interstitial cells, located between other cells, into luteinized theca cells. Theca cells are located in the ovarian follicles and become luteinized when the ovarian follicle bursts and a new corpus luteum is formed. The dispersal of luteinized theca cells throughout the ovarian stroma—in contrast to their distribution in PMOS, in which luteinized theca cells occur around cystic follicles only—causes women with hyperthecosis to have higher testosterone levels and virilization than women with PMOS. Elevated insulin is also characteristic of hyperthecosis. Hyperthecosis most commonly develops in postmenopausal women and is linked to acne, hirsutism, growth of the clitoris, baldness, and voice deepening.

Obesity can play a role in insulin resistance. It makes thecal cells more responsive to luteinizing hormone. Therefore, obesity increases ovarian androgen production. Additionally, obesity elevates inflammatory adipokines which leads to not only adipogenesis, but also heightened insulin resistance.

=== Cushing's syndrome ===
Cushing's syndrome develops as a result of long-term exposure to the hormone cortisol. Cushing's syndrome can either be exogenous or endogenous, depending on whether it is caused by an external or internal source, respectively. The intake of glucocorticoids, a type of corticosteroid, is a common cause for the development of exogenous Cushing's syndrome. Endogenous Cushing's syndrome can occur when the body produces excess cortisol. This occurs when the hypothalamus of the brain signals to the pituitary gland with excess corticotropin-releasing hormone, which in turn secretes adrenocorticotropin hormone (ACTH). ACTH then causes the adrenal glands to release cortisol into the blood. Signs of Cushing's syndrome include muscle weakness, easy bruising, weight gain, male-pattern hair growth (hirsutism), coloured stretch marks, and an excessively reddish complexion in the face. Cushing's syndrome can cause androgen excess and hence the signs and symptoms of hyperandrogenism.

=== Congenital adrenal hyperplasia ===
Congenital adrenal hyperplasia (CAH) describes a group of autosomal recessive disorders that cause a lack of an enzyme necessary for the production of cortisol and/or aldosterone, steroid hormones produced by the adrenal cortex. Most cases of CAH are due to 21-hydroxylase deficiencies. The heightened androgen levels seen in congenital adrenal hyperplasia affect the hypothalamic–pituitary–gonadal axis. Heightened androgen levels can also affect the ovaries, which can lead to infertility as well as chronic anovulation.

Since CAH consists of multiple disorders, the signs, symptoms and severity of hyperandrogenism may stem from a variety of specific mutations. Genotyping is therefore critical to verify diagnoses and to establish prognostic factors for individuals. Genotyping is also crucial for people seeking to use genetic counselling as an aid to family planning.

In women, CAH causes ambiguous genitals at birth and excessive pubic hair, enlargement of the clitoris, and hirsutism in adolescence. Although CAH causes rapid growth in childhood, adult women with CAH are shorter than average due to early puberty and closure of the growth plates in the long bones. Symptoms in males include early showings of pubic hair, enlargement of the penis, and rapid musculoskeletal growth.

=== Tumors ===
==== Adrenocortical carcinoma and tumors ====
Adrenocortical carcinoma occurs rarely; the average incidence rate is estimated to be 1–2 cases per million annually. The disease involves the formation of cancerous cells within the cortex of one or both of the adrenal glands. Although these tumors are identified in fewer than two percent of patients diagnosed with hyperandrogenism, the possibility must be considered within this population. In one study, more than half of tumor-affected patients had elevated levels of the androgens androstenedione, dehydroepiandrosterone sulfate, and testosterone. The elevation of androgens caused by adrenocortical carcinomas often causes patients to develop Cushing's syndrome, primary aldosteronism, and hyperandrogenism. The molecular basis of the disease has yet to be elucidated.

==== Adenoma of the adrenal gland ====
Adrenal adenomas are benign tumors of the adrenal gland. In most cases, the tumors display no symptoms and require no treatment. In rare cases, however, some adrenal adenomas may become activated. When activated, the adenoma begins to produce hormones in much larger quantities than what the adrenal glands would normally produce, leading to health complications including primary aldosteronism and hyperandrogenism.

==== Arrhenoblastoma ====
Arrhenoblastoma is an uncommon tumor of the ovary. It is composed of sterol cells, Leydig cells, or some combination of the two. The tumor can produce male or female hormones and may cause masculinization. In a prepubescent child, a tumor may cause precocious puberty. Malignant arrhenoblastoma accounts for 30% of cases of arrhenoblastoma, the other 70% being largely benign and curable with surgery.

==== Hilar cell tumor ====
A hilar cell tumor is an androgen-producing ovarian tumor that is most commonly found in older women and often leads to the development of male sex characteristics. The tumor tends to occur around the region of the ovary where the blood vessels enter the organ, known as the hilum. This type of tumor tends to be small in size and in most cases can be entirely removed and its symptoms reversed through surgery.

==== Krukenberg tumor ====
A Krukenberg tumor is a quickly developing malignant tumor found in one or both ovaries. In most cases, the tumor primarily originates from tissues in the stomach, pancreas, gallbladder, colon, or breast. It colonized the ovary by spreading through the peritoneal cavity. These tumors cause virilization. Increased androgen production due to elevations in human chorionic gonadotropin is hypothesized as the main cause of hyperandrogenism in women with Krukenberg tumors.

=== Menopause ===
The end of ovulation and the beginning of menopause can result in hyperandrogenism. During this transition, the body stops releasing estrogen at a faster rate than it stops releasing androgens. In some cases, the difference between the lower estrogen levels and higher androgen levels can produce hyperandrogenism. A decrease in sex hormone levels while the free androgen index increases can also contribute to this process.

=== Drugs ===
Many drugs can provoke symptoms of hyperandrogenism. These symptoms include, but are not limited to hirsutism, acne, dermatitis, androgenic alopecia, irregularities in menstruation, clitoral hypertrophy, and the deepening of the voice. Drugs most frequently implicated in hyperandrogenism include anabolic steroids, synthetic progestins, and antiepileptics; however, many other drugs may also cause hyperandrogenism. This can happen through one of five mechanisms: the direct introduction of androgens to the body, the binding of the drug to androgen receptors (as is the case with anabolic-androgenic steroids), a reduction of sex hormone-binding globulin plasma concentration that leads to an increase in free testosterone, interference with the hypothalamic–pituitary–ovarian (HPO) axis, or an increase in the release of adrenal androgens. Certain drugs cause hyperandrogenism through mechanisms that remain unclear. For example, the molecular basis by which valproate induces hyperandrogenism and polyendocrine metabolic ovarian syndrome has yet to be determined. However, one study showed that women taking valproic acid had higher testosterone levels and incidences of hyperandrogenism compared to women who were not taking valproic acid.

=== Heredity ===
Hyperandrogenism can appear as a symptom of many different genetic and medical conditions. Some of the conditions with hyperandrogenic symptoms, including PMOS, may sometimes be hereditary. Additionally, it is thought that epigenetics may contribute to the pathogenesis of polyendocrine metabolic ovarian syndrome.

One potential cause of PMOS is maternal hyperandrogenism, whereby hormonal irregularities in the mother can affect the development of the child during gestation, resulting in the passing of polyendocrine metabolic ovarian syndrome from mother to child. However, no androgen elevations were found in the umbilical cord blood of children born to mothers with PMOS.

== Diagnosis ==
Diagnosing hyperandrogenism can be complex due to the wide variety and severity of signs and symptoms that may present. It is most often diagnosed by checking for signs of hirsutism according to a standardized method that scores the range of excess hair growth.

Girls may show symptoms of hyperandrogenism early in life, but physicians become more concerned when the patient is in her late teens or older.

Checking medical history and a physical examination of symptoms are used for an initial diagnosis. Patient history assessed includes age at thelarche, adrenarche, and menarche; patterns of menstruation; obesity; reproductive history; and the start and advancement of hyperandrogenism symptoms. Patterns of menstruation are examined since irregular patterns may accompany hyperandrogenism. Other conditions that may present alongside hirsutism that can contribute to diagnosis include androgenic alopecia and acne. If hyperandrogenism is severe, virilization may occur.

Family history is also assessed for occurrences of hyperandrogenism symptoms or obesity in other family members.

Laboratory tests can measure FSH, luteininzing hormone, DHEAS, prolactin, 17α-hydroxyprogesterone, and total and free testosterone in the blood. Abnormally high levels of any of these hormones help in diagnosing hyperandrogenism.

== Prevention ==
Since risk factors are not known and vary among individuals with hyperandrogenism, there is no sure method to prevent the condition. Accordingly, more long-term studies are needed to find a cause of the condition before a sufficient method of prevention can be established.

Despite this, there are a few things that can help avoid long-term medical issues related to hyperandrogenism and PMOS. Getting checked by a medical professional for hyperandrogenism — especially if one has a family history of the condition, irregular periods, or diabetes — can be beneficial. A healthy weight and diet may reduce the chances, as continued exercise and a healthy diet lead to an improved menstrual cycle, decreased insulin levels, and lowered androgen concentrations.

== Treatment ==
There is no definitive treatment for hyperandrogenism as it varies with the underlying condition that causes it. As a hormonal symptom of PMOS, menopause, and other endocrine conditions, it is primarily treated as a symptom of these conditions. Drugs may be considered only in women who do not plan on becoming pregnant in the near future. Some effective drugs for facial hirsutism includes eflornithine, which may cause birth defects in pregnant women. Retinoids and antibiotics can be used for acne and minoxidil for alopecia. Systemically, it is treated with antiandrogens such as cyproterone acetate, flutamide and spironolactone to reduce androgenic signaling. For hyperandrogenism caused by late-onset congenital adrenal hyperplasia (LOCAH), treatment is primarily focused on providing the patient with glucocorticoids to combat the low cortisol production and the corresponding increase in androgens caused by the increase in size of the adrenal glands. Estrogen-based oral contraceptives are used to treat both LOCAH- and PMOS-associated hyperandrogenism. These hormonal treatments reduce the androgen excess and suppress adrenal androgen production, bringing about a significant decrease in hirsutism.

Hyperandrogenism is often managed symptomatically. Hirsutism and acne both respond well to the hormonal treatments described above, with 60–100% of patients reporting an improvement in hirsutism. Androgenic alopecia however, does not show an improvement with hormonal treatments and requires other treatments, such as hair transplantation.

Supplementation can also contribute to the managing the symptomatic effects of hyperandrogenism. In a meta-analysis, high-dose vitamin D supplements given to women with vitamin D deficiency due to PMOS improved glucose levels, insulin sensitivity, and cholesterol levels, as well as lowering testosterone, sex hormone-binding globulin, and the free androgen index, all of which are associated with hyperandrogenism. Vitamin D supplementation in women with vitamin D deficiency but without PMOS did not show the same results.

=== Targeting insulin resistance and obesity ===
Lifestyle modifications are the first-line treatment for PMOS. They help improve body composition, insulin resistance, and hyperandrogenism. However, it is unclear whether they help improve mood, quality of life, and reproductive outcomes. A meta-analysis study in 2017 showed that bariatric surgery in women with severe obesity and PMOS decreased levels of total and free testosterone and helped correct hirsutism and menstrual dysfunction.

Insulin resistance in women with PMOS is typically treated with insulin-sensitizer drugs such as metformin. Metformin can help to decrease weight and androgen levels. When combined with lifestyle modifications (changes in diet and exercise), it has been linked with lower body mass index and a reduction in menstrual problems. However, the use of metformin in women with PMOS should only be considered in patients with impaired glucose tolerance.

== Society and culture ==
Because androgen excess is manifested in noticeable physical features (such as hirsutism), social stigma may be associated with it.

=== Sports ===
Current evidence-based studies show that unusually high levels of circulating testosterone are associated with increased athletic performance in women, unless they lack androgen sensitivity. However, controversy has emerged in the form of the claim that testosterone is not unlike any other physical parameter with reference to bestowing advantages or disadvantages on female athletes. Existing regulations throughout competitive sports are currently being refined to specifically address this particular claim.

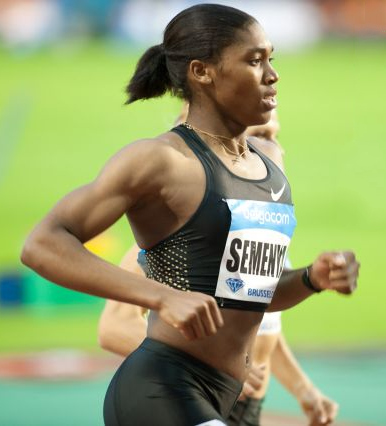
Caster Semenya, a genetically XY athlete with 5-alpha reductase deficiency.

Following the case of South African athlete Caster Semenya, an athlete with a difference in sex development (DSD) and internal testes, the International Association of Athletics Federations introduced its hyperandrogenism regulations, which restricted those registered as women with high testosterone levels, whether the hormones were produced by ovaries, adrenals, or testes. These regulations replaced the earlier sex verification rules.

Following a series of legal challenges, regulations called the Eligibility Regulations for the Female Classification (Athletes with Differences of Sexual Development) were released on 1 May 2019. These regulations apply only to athletes who have a DSD, high testosterone and virilization, and no longer include hyperandrogenism from non-DSD-related causes such as PMOS. Such DSDs, often seen in people who have a Y chromosome and testes, include 5α‐reductase deficiency, partial androgen insensitivity, and congenital adrenal hyperplasia.

=== Social definition ===
Cultural variation can define hyperandrogenism socially—apart from clinical and chemical definitions—to make some hair growth unacceptable even if it is considered clinically normal based on metrics like the Ferriman-Gallwey score. For example, only pubic and axillary hair may be tolerated in North American women, while other androgen-dependent hair such as growth on the upper lip, over the linea alba, on the thighs, and around the areola is not.

=== Organizations ===
Professional organizations such as the Androgen Excess and PCOS Society exist to promote the research, treatment, diagnosis, and prevention of such disorders and to educate the public and scientific community about them.

InterACT, an intersex organization, listed hyperandrogenism as an intersex variation in a glossary from 2022.

== See also ==
- Hypoandrogenism
- Hypergonadism
- Hypergonadotropic hypergonadism
- Hypogonadism
- Hyperestrogenism
- Hypoestrogenism
- Androgen-dependent condition
