= Prostate hypoplasia =

Congenital abnormality of a small prostate gland

Prostate hypoplasia is the congenital abnormality of a small (or absent) prostate gland. Often associated with other abnormalities of the urogenital system. Often due to abnormality in mesenchymal cells and associated with prune belly syndrome. Observed in 5α-reductase 2 deficiency in which impaired 5α-dihydrotestosterone (DHT) synthesis impairs prostate development which is DHT dependent.
