= Kansar =

Sweet dessert popular in Gujarat, India

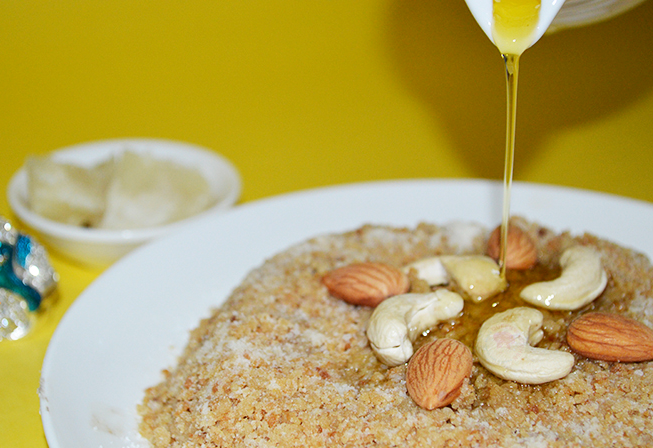
- Kansar (Lapsi)
- Alternative names: Kansar
- Course: Dessert
- Region or state: South Gujarat, Gujarat, India
- Serving temperature: Hot
- Main ingredients: Cracked wheat, gour, ghee

Kansar (Also known as Lapsi) is a sweet dessert from Gujarat, India, whose main ingredients are whole wheat flour or broken wheat, sugar powder and clarified butter. Serving Kansar to guests is considered a sign of respect and a commitment to loyalty and love in Gujarati culture, and the dish plays a part in traditional wedding ceremonies and every happy occasion.

Ingredients:

1 cup coarse whole wheat flour bhakri lot or lapsi lot

2 tablespoons oil or ghee

½ cup tepid water approximately

For Serving:

½ cup powdered sugar

½ cup melted ghee

Equipment:

Steamer or a pressure cooker with a separator vessel

A bowl that fits inside the cooker

Mixing bowl

Method:

In a mixing bowl, take the coarse whole wheat flour.

Add the 2 tablespoons of oil or ghee (this is called 'mohan'). Mix well.

Gradually add the tepid water and knead a very stiff dough.

Shape the dough into a single large ball or log and make a few indentations with knuckles.

Place the dough ball in a vessel that fits inside the steamer or pressure cooker.

Add water to the steamer or pressure cooker base.

Place the vessel with the dough inside.

Steam for about 20-25 minutes. If using a pressure cooker, do not put the whistle on.

After steaming, carefully remove the vessel. The dough should be cooked through.

While the cooked dough is still hot, break it apart with a spoon or hands into a large bowl.

Crumble it into a coarse, breadcrumb-like texture.

To serve:

Take a portion of the hot, crumbled Kansar in a serving bowl.

Make a well in the center.

Pour a generous amount of melted ghee and add a few spoonfuls of powdered sugar.

Mix it just before eating.

Notes:

● Using coarse wheat flour is essential for the authentic texture of Kansar.

● Steaming, not boiling, is the correct method of cooking. Using a pressure cooker without the whistle effectively turns it into a steamer.

● Kansar is meant to be assembled at the time of eating. The combination of hot, crumbly wheat with melted ghee and sugar is what makes it special.

== See also ==
- List of desserts
