= Virilization =

Biological development of male sex characteristics

Virilization or masculinization is the biological development of adult male characteristics in young males or females. Most of the changes of virilization are produced by androgens.

Virilization is a medical term commonly used in three medical and biology of sex contexts: prenatal biological sexual differentiation, the postnatal changes of typical chromosomal male (46, XY) puberty, and excessive androgen effects in typical chromosomal females (46, XX). It is also the intended result of androgen replacement therapy in males with delayed puberty and low testosterone.

== Prenatal virilization ==
In the prenatal period, virilization refers to closure of the perineum, thinning and wrinkling (rugation) of the scrotum, growth of the penis, and closure of the urethral groove to the tip of the penis. In this context, masculinization is synonymous with virilization.

Prenatal virilization of XX fetuses and undervirilization of XY fetuses are common causes of ambiguous genitalia such as in conditions like Congenital adrenal hyperplasia and 5α-Reductase 2 deficiency.

For many years, it was widely believed that in mammals, the female is the "default" developmental pathway, and the SRY gene on the Y chromosome is responsible for suppressing the development of female characteristics and stimulating males characteristics. In this scenario, an embryo would passively develop female sexual characteristics without intervention by the SRY gene. However, in the early 2000s, other genes, such as WNT4 and RSPO1, were discovered that perform the opposite function – i.e., genes which suppress masculinization and stimulate feminization.

Two processes: defeminization, and masculinization, are involved in producing male typical morphology and behavior.

=== High ===
Prenatal virilization of a genetically female fetus can occur when an excessive amount of androgen is produced by the fetal adrenal glands or is present in maternal blood, resulting in virilization of the female genitalia such as an enlarged clitoris.

It can also be associated with progestin-induced virilisation.

=== Low ===
Undervirilization can occur if a genetic male cannot produce enough androgen or the body tissues cannot respond to it. Extreme undervirilization occurs when no significant androgen hormones can be produced or the body is completely insensitive to androgens, in which case a female phenotype will develop. Partial undervirilization produces ambiguous genitalia part-way between male and female. Examples of undervirilization in fetuses with a 46,XY karyotype are androgen insensitivity syndrome and 5 alpha reductase deficiency.

== Normal virilization ==
In common as well as medical usage, virilization often refers to the process of normal male puberty. These effects include growth of the penis and the testes, accelerated growth, development of pubic hair, and other androgenic hair of face, torso, and limbs, deepening of the voice, increased musculature, thickening of the jaw, prominence of the neck cartilage, and broadening of the shoulders.

== Abnormal childhood virilization ==
Virilization can occur in childhood in both males and females due to excessive amounts of androgens. Typical effects of virilization in children are pubic hair, accelerated growth and bone maturation, increased muscle strength, acne, and adult body odor. In males, virilization may signal precocious puberty, while congenital adrenal hyperplasia and androgen producing tumors (usually) of the gonads or adrenals are occasional causes in both sexes.

== In adolescent or adult females ==
Virilization in females can manifest as clitoral enlargement, increased muscle strength, acne, hirsutism, frontal hair thinning, deepening of the voice, menstrual disruption due to anovulation, and a strengthened libido. Some of the possible causes of virilization in females are:

- Androgen-producing tumors of the
  - ovaries
  - adrenal glands (see adrenal tumor)
  - pituitary gland (see pituitary adenoma)
- Hyperthecosis
- Hypothyroidism
- Anabolic steroid exposure
- Congenital adrenal hyperplasia due to 21-hydroxylase deficiency (late-onset)
- Conn's syndrome

== Medically induced virilization in transgender people ==
Transgender people who were medically assigned female at birth sometimes elect to take hormone replacement therapy. This process causes virilization by inducing many of the effects of a typically male puberty. Many of these effects are permanent, but some effects can be reversed if the transgender individual stops or pauses their medical treatment.

=== Permanent virilization effects ===
- Deepening of the voice
- Growth of facial and body hair
- Male-pattern baldness
- Enlargement of the clitoris
- Breast atrophy – possible shrinking and/or softening of breasts

=== Reversible virilization effects ===
- Further muscle development (especially upper body)
- Increased sweat and changes in body odor
- Prominence of veins and coarser skin
- Alterations in blood lipids (cholesterol and triglycerides)
- Increased red blood cell count

== Demasculinization ==
Demasculinization refers to the reversal of virilization. Some but not all aspects of virilization are reversible. Demasculinization occurs naturally with andropause, pathologically with hypogonadism, and artificially or medically with antiandrogens, estrogens, and orchiectomy. It is desired by many transgender women who have undergone the changes of pubertal masculinization. Some virilized traits remain though (such as body hair, a hard jawline and an enlarged larynx), due to the fashion in which virilization affects a body's physiology.

== See also ==
- Androgen
- Clitoromegaly
- Defeminization
- Feminization (biology)
- Hirsutism
- Intersex
- Secondary sex characteristics
- Sexual differentiation
- Transient masculinization
