= Malignant (disambiguation) =

Malignant refers to malignancy, the tendency of a medical condition to become progressively worse.

Malignant may also refer to:

- Malignant (2013 film), an American horror film directed by Brian Avenet-Bradley
- Malignant (2021 film), an American horror film directed by James Wan
- "Malignant" (Law & Order: Criminal Intent), an episode of Law & Order: Criminal Intent
- Malignant: How Cancer Becomes Us, a 2013 book by S. Lochlann Jain

== See also ==
- Cancer (disambiguation)
- Tumor
