= Gonad =

Gland that produces sex cells

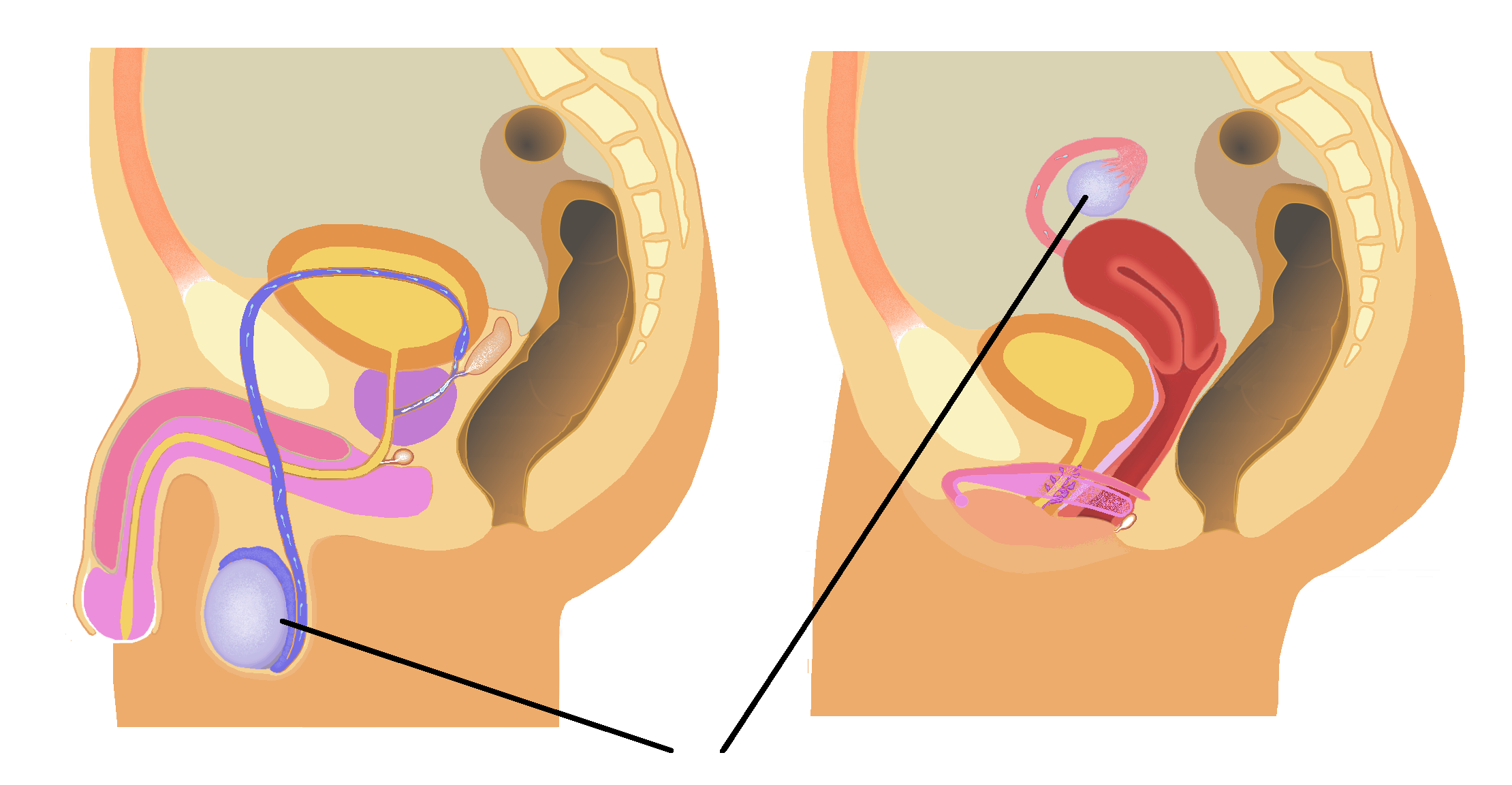
- Male gonad (testes, left) and female gonad (ovaries, right)

Identifiers
- MeSH: D006066
- FMA: 18250

A gonad, sex gland, or reproductive organ is a gland and sex organ that produces the gametes (reproductive cells), and sex hormones of an organism. Female reproductive cells are egg cells, and male reproductive cells are sperm cells.

The male gonad, the testicle, produces sperm cells, the female gonad, the ovary, produces egg cells. Both of these gametes are haploid cells. Some hermaphroditic animals and some humans have a type of gonad called an ovotestis that contains both ovarian and testicular tissue. It is hard to find a common origin for gonads, but gonads most likely evolved independently several times.

== Regulation ==
The gonads are controlled by luteinizing hormone (LH) and follicle-stimulating hormone (FSH), produced and secreted by gonadotropes or gonadotrophins in the anterior pituitary gland. This secretion is regulated by gonadotropin-releasing hormone (GnRH) produced in the hypothalamus.

== Development ==
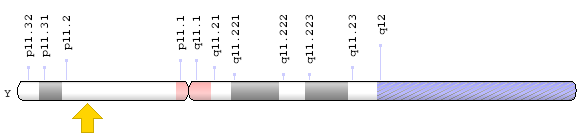
Position of the SRY gene located on short arm of the Y chromosome (indicated by the yellow arrow)

The gonads develop from three sources; the mesothelium, underlying mesenchyme and the primordial germ cells. Gonads start developing as a common primordium (an organ in the earliest stage of development), in the form of a genital ridge, at the sixth week, which are only later differentiated to male or female sex organs (except when they are not differentiated). The presence of the SRY gene, located on the short arm of the Y chromosome and encoding the testis determining factor, usually determines male sexual differentiation. In the absence of the SRY gene from the Y chromosome, usually the female sex (ovaries instead of testes) will develop. The development of the gonads is a part of the development of the urinary and reproductive organs.

== Clinical significance ==
The gonads are subject to many diseases, such as hypergonadism, hypogonadism, gonadal dysgenesis (agonadism), and cancer among others.

=== Hypergonadism ===
Hypergonadism is a condition where there is a hyperfunction of the gonads. It can manifest as precocious puberty, and is caused by abnormally high levels of testosterone or estrogen, crucial hormones for sexual development. In some cases, it may be caused by a tumor, which can be malignant, but is more commonly benign. Anabolic steroids may also be a major cause of high androgen and estrogen functional activity. Other possible causes include head injuries and brain inflammatory diseases. Hypergonadism may contribute to symptoms such as precocious puberty and abnormal facial hair growth in females.

=== Hypogonadism ===
Hypogonadism means diminished functional activity of the gonads—the testicles or the ovaries—that may result in diminished production of sex hormones. Low androgen (e.g., testosterone) levels are referred to as hypoandrogenism and low estrogen (e.g., estradiol) as hypoestrogenism. These are responsible for the observed signs and symptoms in both males and females.

=== Gonadal dysgenesis ===
Gonadal dysgenesis is classified as any congenital developmental disorder of the reproductive system characterized by a progressive loss of primordial germ cells on the developing gonads of an embryo. One type of gonadal dysgenesis is the development of functionless, fibrous tissue, termed streak gonads, instead of reproductive tissue. Streak gonads are a form of aplasia, resulting in hormonal failure that manifests as sexual infantism and infertility, with no initiation of puberty and secondary sex characteristics.

=== Ovarian Cancer ===
Ovarian cancer is a cancerous tumor of an ovary. It may originate from the ovary itself or more commonly from nearby structures such as fallopian tubes or the inner lining of the abdomen. The ovary is made up of three different cell types including epithelial cells, germ cells, and stromal cells. When these cells become abnormal, they can divide and form tumors. These cells can also invade or metastasize (spread) to other parts of the body. When this process begins, there may be no or only vague symptoms. Symptoms become more noticeable as the cancer progresses. These symptoms may include bloating, vaginal bleeding, pelvic pain, abdominal swelling, constipation, and loss of appetite, among others. Common areas to which the cancer may spread include the lining of the abdomen, lymph nodes, lungs, and liver.

=== Testicular Cancer ===
Testicular cancer is cancer that develops in the testicles, a part of the male reproductive system. Symptoms may include a lump in the testicle or swelling or pain in the scrotum. Treatment may result in infertility.

Risk factors include an undescended testis, family history of the disease, and previous history of testicular cancer. More than 95% are germ cell tumors which are divided into seminomas and non-seminomas. Other types include sex-cord stromal tumors and lymphomas. Diagnosis is typically based on a physical exam, ultrasound, and blood tests. Surgical removal of the testicle with examination under a microscope is then done to determine the type.

== Aging ==
=== Ovarian aging ===
A delay in having children is common in the developed world and this delay is often associated with ovarian female infertility and subfertility. Ovarian aging is characterized by progressive decline of the quality and number of oocytes. This decline is likely due, in part, to reduced expression of genes that encode proteins necessary for DNA repair and meiosis. Such reduced expression can lead to increased DNA damage and errors in meiotic recombination.

=== Testicular aging ===
The testes of older men often have sperm abnormalities that can ultimately lead to male infertility. These abnormalities include accumulation of DNA damage and decreased DNA repair ability. During spermatogenesis in the testis, spontaneous new mutations arise and tend to accumulate with age.

== See also ==
- Gonadosomatic index
- Hypothalamic–pituitary–gonadal axis
