= Feminization (biology) =

Development of female characteristics

In biology and medicine, feminization is the development in an organism of physical characteristics that are usually unique to the females of the species. This may represent a normal developmental process, contributing to sexual differentiation. Feminization can also be induced by environmental factors, and this phenomenon has been observed in several animal species. In the case of feminizing hormone therapy, it is intentionally induced medically.

== Pathological feminization ==
In animals, when feminization occurs in a male, or at an inappropriate developmental age, it is often due to a genetic or acquired disorder of the endocrine system. In humans, one of the more common manifestations of abnormal feminization is gynecomastia, the inappropriate development of breasts which may result from elevated levels of feminizing hormones such as estrogens. Deficiency or blockage of virilizing hormones (androgens) can also contribute to feminization. In some cases, high levels of androgens may produce both virilizing effects (increased body hair, deepened voice, increased muscle mass, etc.) and feminizing effects (gynecomastia) since androgens can be converted to estrogens by aromatase in the peripheral tissues.

In insects, feminization can occur through inheritance of reproduction-manipulating endosymbionts. This promotes the inheritance of the endosymbionts because the endosymbionts are passed on by mothers to their eggs. As such, the more endosymbiont-infected females there are in a population, the more the endosymbionts are passed on to the next generation.

== See also ==
- Defeminization
- Virilization
- Sex-determination system
