= Hyperthecosis =

- Other names: Ovarian hyperthecosis
- Specialty: Gynecology

Hyperthecosis, or ovarian hyperthecosis, is hyperplasia of the theca interna of the ovary. Hyperthecosis occurs when an area of luteinization occurs along with stromal hyperplasia. The luteinized cells produce androgens, which may lead to hirsutism and virilization (or masculinization) in affected women.

The term hyperthecosis refers to the presence of nests of luteinized theca cells in the ovarian stroma due to differentiation of the ovarian interstitial cells into steroidogenically active luteinized stromal cells. These nests or islands of luteinized theca cells are scattered throughout the stroma of the ovary, rather than being confined to areas around cystic follicles as in polyendocrine metabolic ovarian syndrome (PMOS). These luteinized theca cells result in greater production of androgens.

Seen as a severe form of PMOS, the clinical features of hyperthecosis are similar to those of PMOS. Women with hyperthecosis often have more markedly elevated testosterone, more hirsutism, and are much more likely to be virilized. While elevated androgens in postmenopausal women is rare, hyperthecosis can present in both premenopausal or postmenopausal women. Women with hyperthecosis may or may not have always had underlying PMOS.

== Cause ==
The etiology of hyperthecosis is unknown, however evidence suggests a possibility of genetic transmission. Hyperthecosis has been documented in familiar patterns. Insulin resistance may also play a role in the pathogenesis of hyperthecosis. Women with hyperthecosis have a significant degree of insulin resistance and insulin may stimulate the ovarian stromal androgen synthesis.

== Prognosis ==
Although no large studies showing the long term outcomes for women with hyperthecosis exist, a diagnosis of hyperthecosis may suggest an increased risk for metabolic complications of hyperlipidemia and type 2 diabetes. In postmenopausal women, hyperthecosis may also contribute to the pathogenesis of endometrial polyp, endometrial hyperplasia, and endometrioid adenocarcinoma due to the association of hyperestrinism (excess estrins in the body) and hyperthecosis. Treatment for hyperthecosis is based upon each case, but may range from pharmacological interventions to surgical.

== See also ==
- Polyendocrine metabolic ovarian syndrome
