= 5α-Reductase 2 deficiency =

Medical condition

- Other names: 5-alpha reductase deficiency, Pseudovaginal perineoscrotal hypospadias 46,XY disorder of sex development due to 5-alpha-reductase 2 deficiency.
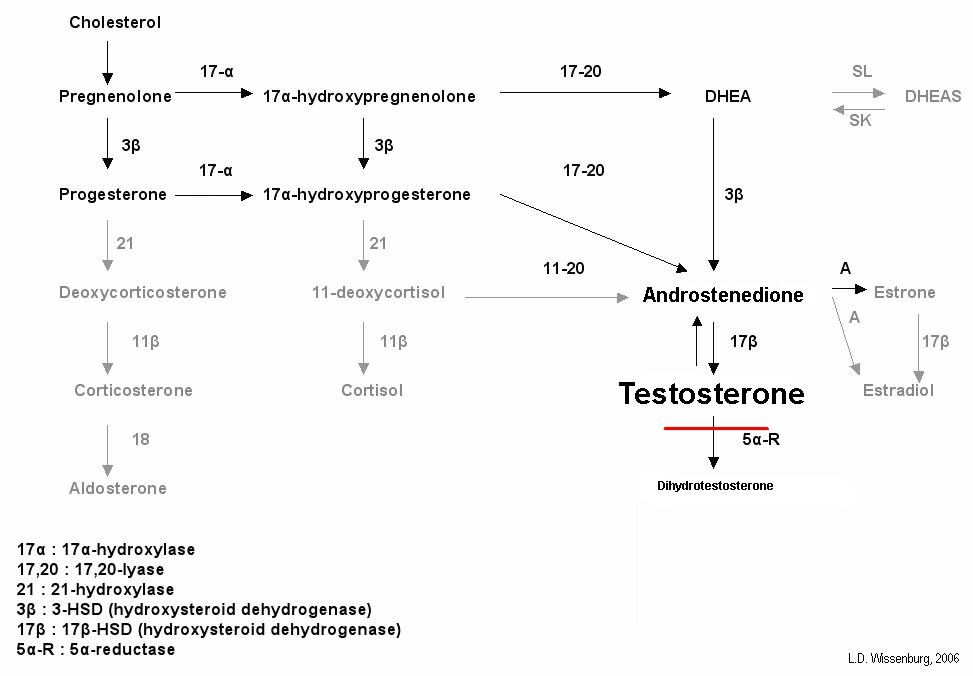
- Biochemistry; testosterone biosynthesis, pathology in 5 alpha-reductase deficiency.
- Specialty: Medical genetics
- Causes: Mutations in the SRD5A2 gene.

5α-Reductase 2 deficiency (5αR2D) is an autosomal recessive condition caused by mutations impairing the function of SRD5A2, a gene located on chromosome 2 and encoding the enzyme 5α-reductase type 2 (5αR2). 5αR2 is expressed in specific tissues and catalyzes the transformation of testosterone (T) to 5α-dihydrotestosterone (DHT). DHT plays a key role in the process of sexual differentiation.

This rare deficiency causes atypical sex development in genetic males (people with a 46XY karyotype), with a broad spectrum of presentations most apparent in the genitalia. Many people with 5-alpha reductase deficiency are assigned female at birth based on their external genitalia. In other cases, affected infants are assigned male at birth based on their external genitalia, often an unusually small penis (micropenis) and the urethra opening on the underside of the penis (hypospadias). Still other affected infants may be assigned either female or male at birth as their external genitalia do not look clearly male or clearly female.

During puberty, an increase in the levels of androgens leads to the development of some secondary sex characteristics, such as increased muscle mass, deepening of the voice, development of pubic hair, and a growth spurt. The penis may grow larger. People with 5-alpha reductase deficiency do not develop much facial or body hair or male pattern hair loss.

== Signs and symptoms ==
Affected individuals exhibit a broad spectrum of presentation including atypical genitalia (ranging from female-appearing to underutilized male), hypospadias, and isolated micropenis. The internal reproductive structures (vasa deferentia, seminal vesicles, epididymides and ejaculatory ducts) are normal but testes are usually undescended and prostate hypoplasia is common. Males with the same mutations in SRD5A2 can have different phenotypes suggesting additional factors that are involved in clinical presentation. Although people who are genetically female (with two X chromosomes in each cell) may inherit variants in both copies of the SRD5A2 gene, their sexual development is not affected. The development of female sex characteristics does not require DHT, so a lack of steroid 5-alpha reductase 2 activity does not cause physical changes in these individuals.

Virilization of genitalia with voice deepening, development of muscle mass occurs at puberty in affected individuals, and height is not impaired. Gynecomastia is uncommon and bone density is normal in contrast to 46,XY DSD from other causes such as partial androgen insensitivity syndrome and 17β-hydroxysteroid dehydrogenase 3 deficiency. Hair on the face and body is reduced and male pattern baldness does not occur.

Spontaneous fertility in 5αR2D affected individuals is very unusual (though has been observed) due to semen abnormalities that include reduced sperm counts, high semen viscosity and, in some cases, lack of primary spermatocytes. This supports the notion that DHT has an important role in spermatocyte differentiation. The broad spectrum of presentation is consistent with highly varying sperm counts among affected individuals. Testicular function may also be impaired by incomplete descent as well as the genetic mutation itself.

== Genetics ==
Two different genes, each with five exons and four introns, designated as SRD5A1 and SRD5A2, encode two different 5α-reductases. The human 5α-reductase-2 gene (SRD5A2) is located on the short arm of chromosome 2 at band 23 and encodes a 254 amino acid protein, called 5α-reductase type 2. The 5α-reductase-1 gene (SRD5A1) is located in band 15 on the short arm of chromosome 5 and encodes a 259 amino acid protein, called 5α-reductase type 1. The high amino acid sequence identity of their proteins (approximately 60%) indicates the possibility of a common precursor gene during evolution. But the role of 5α-reductase type 1 is not well defined.

Mutations in the SRD5A2 gene can result in a 46,XY disorder of sex development(46,XY DSD) called 5α-reductase-2 deficiency. These mutations are more often observed in areas with a specific ethnic background and high coefficients of inbreeding. They generate proteins with various degrees of enzymatic activity ranging from an unstable isoenzyme to complete loss of enzymatic activity. Of the 254 amino acids in the 5a-reductase type 2 protein, mutations in codons specifying 67 different residues have been identified, with multiple mutations in the codons of several amino acids.

The first known mutation SRD5A2 was almost a complete deletion that was discovered from an analysis of affected individuals in a Papua New Guinean tribe. The majority of SRD5A2 mutations are missense mutations, but small deletions, splice junction mutations, and gross deletions were also observed. Mutations result in a spectrum of activity effects ranging from destabilizing 5αR2 to complete loss of activity.

SRD5A2 mutations are inherited in an autosomal recessive pattern. Homozygous defects are more common than compound heterozygous ones. A phenotype-genotype correlation is not known to exist for many of the most common mutations, and affected individuals with the same 5αR2 mutations have variable phenotypes suggesting other interacting genetic factors that determine phenotype.

== Mechanism ==
5α-Reductase type 2 (5αR2) is an enzyme, encoded by the SRD5A2 gene, that is expressed in specific tissues in the male body from fetal development to adulthood. The enzyme catalyzes the transformation of testosterone (T) to 5α-dihydrotestosterone (DHT) intracellularly. DHT is the most potent ligand to the androgen receptor (AR). Upon binding, the DHT-AR complex translocates from cytoplasm to the nucleus and activates the androgen receptor-regulated genes involved in processes that include male sexual differentiation.

== Diagnosis ==
Diagnosis is usually made between birth and puberty. Pseudovaginal perineoscrotal hypospadias presenting with female-appearing genitalia and pubertal virilization is the classical syndrome attributed to 5αR2D, but modern diagnostic methods can diagnose the deficiency shortly after birth and recognize the broad spectrum of presentation.

The initial diagnosis of 46,XY DSD is indicated by overt genital abnormality. The objective clinical evaluation of dysmorphic features to diagnose 46,XY DSD for apparent female genitalia includes enlarged clitoris, posterior labial fusion, and inguinal/labial mass. For apparent male genitalia: nonpalpable testes, micropenis, isolated perineal hypospadias, or mild hypospadias with undescended testis. Family history and prenatal history are also taken into account in the evaluation. Karyotyping and SRY gene analysis on samples from peripheral leukocytes will exclude sex chromosome abnormalities. With the determination of an XY karyotype and normal SRY, the differential diagnosis of 46,XY DSD is made with endocrinological measurements of T/DHT ratios (which indicate 5αR2 activity) and precise anatomical imaging since 5αR2D can be difficult to distinguish from other causes of 46,XY DSD (e.g., partial androgen insensitivity syndrome and 17β- hydroxysteroid dehydrogenase type 3 enzyme deficiencies).

The measurement of the serum DHT concentration is challenging since the concentrations are low and DHT has a high level of cross-reactivity. A high level of assay specificity is required to measure concentrations of DHT since serum T levels are generally 10-fold higher than DHT in young males. Endocrinological tests for T/DHT ratios can be difficult to interpret since the normal ratio level varies according to age and severity of 5αR2 activity impairment. Affected young males of at least pubertal age with normal serum T levels demonstrate elevated T/DHT levels (normal T, lower than normal DHT). Stimulation with human chorionic gonadotropin (hCG) (alternatively, testosterone enanthate) is required in prepubertal children (with stimulation and samples taken over several days) to increase serum testosterone levels for measurement. Interpreting T/DHT ratios in male newborns is especially challenging due to neonatal testosterone surge and higher than normal 5a-reductase type 1 activity. SRD5A2 gene analysis is recommended for diagnosis in newborns. Broadly, 5αR2D is diagnosed with T/DHT ratios greater than 18 while ratios greater than 30 have been observed in severely affected individuals. 5αR2D can also be indicated by low ratios of 5α- to 5ß- reduced steroids, as measured in urine measured via gas chromatography–mass spectrometry.

Ultrasonography is the primary means for assessing internal reproductive organs for diagnosis while genitography and voiding cystourethrography are used to resolve structures such as urethral and vaginal tracts. The use of pelvic MRI for diagnostic imaging for 5αR2D remains controversial.

== Management ==
One of the most clinically challenging and controversial topics with 46,XY DSD is the practice of "sex assignment" or "sex of rearing". This is especially so in 5αR2D, since most affected individuals have undervirilized genitalia at birth but virilize to varying degrees at puberty. Historically most 5αR2D individuals have been "raised as females", but later reports show that over half of patients who underwent virilizing puberty adopted a male gender identity thus challenging historical practices.

The goal of sex assignment/rearing is to facilitate the greatest likelihood of concordant gender identity in the patient's adulthood. The factors that contribute to gender identity are complex and not easy to report but some factors that contribute include sex chromosomes, androgen exposure, psychosocial development, cultural expectations, family dynamics, and social situation.

Female sex rearing in 5αR2D individuals involves surgical procedures such as childhood gonadectomy (to prevent virilization at puberty) and vaginoplasty. Life-long hormonal treatments as also required for the development and maintenance of female secondary sex characteristics. Male sex of rearing avoids lifelong hormonal treatments and allows for the potential of fertility. Cryptorchidism and hypospadias must be addressed to prevent damage to the seminiferous tubules that are essential for spermatogenesis and fertility. Some approaches encourage a diagnosis during infancy prior to any gender assignment or surgical interventions.

The intersection of the child's well-being, parental wishes, recommendations of the associated medical team, and local laws makes decision-making challenging in these cases. The necessity and ethics around consent and deception involved in administering such interventions have been seriously questioned.

Assisted reproduction methods involving sperm extraction and concentration for intrauterine insemination, intracytoplasmic sperm injection, and in vitro fertilization have all demonstrated successful outcomes for fertility in those with 5αR2D.

== Epidemiology ==
5αR2D is a rare condition with a worldwide distribution. A 2020 study identified 434 cases of 5αR2D across 44 countries including Turkey (23%), China (17%), Italy (9%), and Brazil (7%). The same study also found that genitalia virilization influenced sex assignment while gender change was influenced by cultural aspects across the countries. Molecular diagnosis resulted in favoring male sex assignment in affected newborns.

Many SRD5A2 mutations come from areas with high coefficients of inbreeding, including the Dominican Republic (where people with the condition are called güevedoces – "testes at twelve"), Papua New Guinea (where it is known as kwolu-aatmwol – suggesting a person's transformation "into a male thing"), and Turkey.

== History ==
An autosomal recessive disorder of sex development, described as pseudovaginal perineoscrotal hypospadias (PPSH), was discovered in males in 1961. The main feature of this syndrome was a vulva with the presence of bilateral testes and male urogenital tracts in which the ejaculatory ducts terminate in a blind-ending vagina. This disorder was consistent with 5αR2D as the underlying cause as observed in animal models. 5αR2D was confirmed as the cause in humans in 1974, when studies were done of 24 participants in the Dominican Republic and 2 in Dallas Texas, USA. One of the cases in Dallas began to virilize at puberty and underwent surgery to remove testes and "repair" the apparent clitoromegaly. During surgery, a normal male urogenital tract was observed as well as other features consistent with PPSH. DHT was almost undetectable in cultured fibroblasts from foreskin, epididymis and the presumed "labia majora" whereas in normal males DHT is detected, suggesting impaired DHT formation. Similar conclusions were obtained for participants in a family in the Dominican Republic study, in whom high serum concentration ratios of T to DHT and low concentrations of urinary 5a-reduced androgens were observed. This disorder is now known to be due to homozygous or compound heterozygous loss-of-function mutations of the SRD5A2 gene. The frequency of the deficiency was found to be unusually high in Las Salinas, with occurrence ratio of 1 güevedoce to every 90 unaffected males.

== Society and culture ==
=== Dominican Republic ===
In the Dominican Republic, güevedoces are regarded as a third gender and experience ambivalent gender socialisation. In adulthood, they most commonly self-identify as men, but are not necessarily completely treated as such by society.

=== Papua New Guinea ===
In Papua New Guinea, it has been said that the "girl" is shunned when he begins his natural transformation into a male body and socially assumes a male gender role.

=== Sport ===
In April 2014, the BMJ reported that four elite athletes with 5-ARD were subjected to sterilization and "partial clitoridectomies" in order to compete in women's sport. The authors noted that "partial clitoridectomy" was "not medically indicated, does not relate to real or perceived athletic 'advantage,'" relating to elevated androgen levels. The athletes were all from developing countries where lifetime access to hormone replacement may prove elusive. Intersex advocates regard this intervention as "a clearly coercive process".

=== Popular culture ===
In the Nip/Tuck season three episode "Quentin Costa", it is revealed that Quentin Costa had 5-ARD.

Jeffrey Eugenides' Pulitzer Prize-winning 2002 novel Middlesex is about a young man with 5-ARD. The character was originally born Calliope and raised as a girl, but upon realizing his genetic sex, he transitions into Cal.

=== Notable people ===
- Caster Semenya

== See also ==
- Intersex
- Disorders of sexual development, pseudohermaphroditism, and ambiguous genitalia
- Inborn errors of steroid metabolism
- 5α-Reductase (I, II)
- Androgen (testosterone and dihydrotestosterone)
- Ambiguous genitalia
- Intersex surgery
- Androgen insensitivity syndrome
- Congenital adrenal hyperplasia
