= Clitoromegaly =

Unusually large clitoris

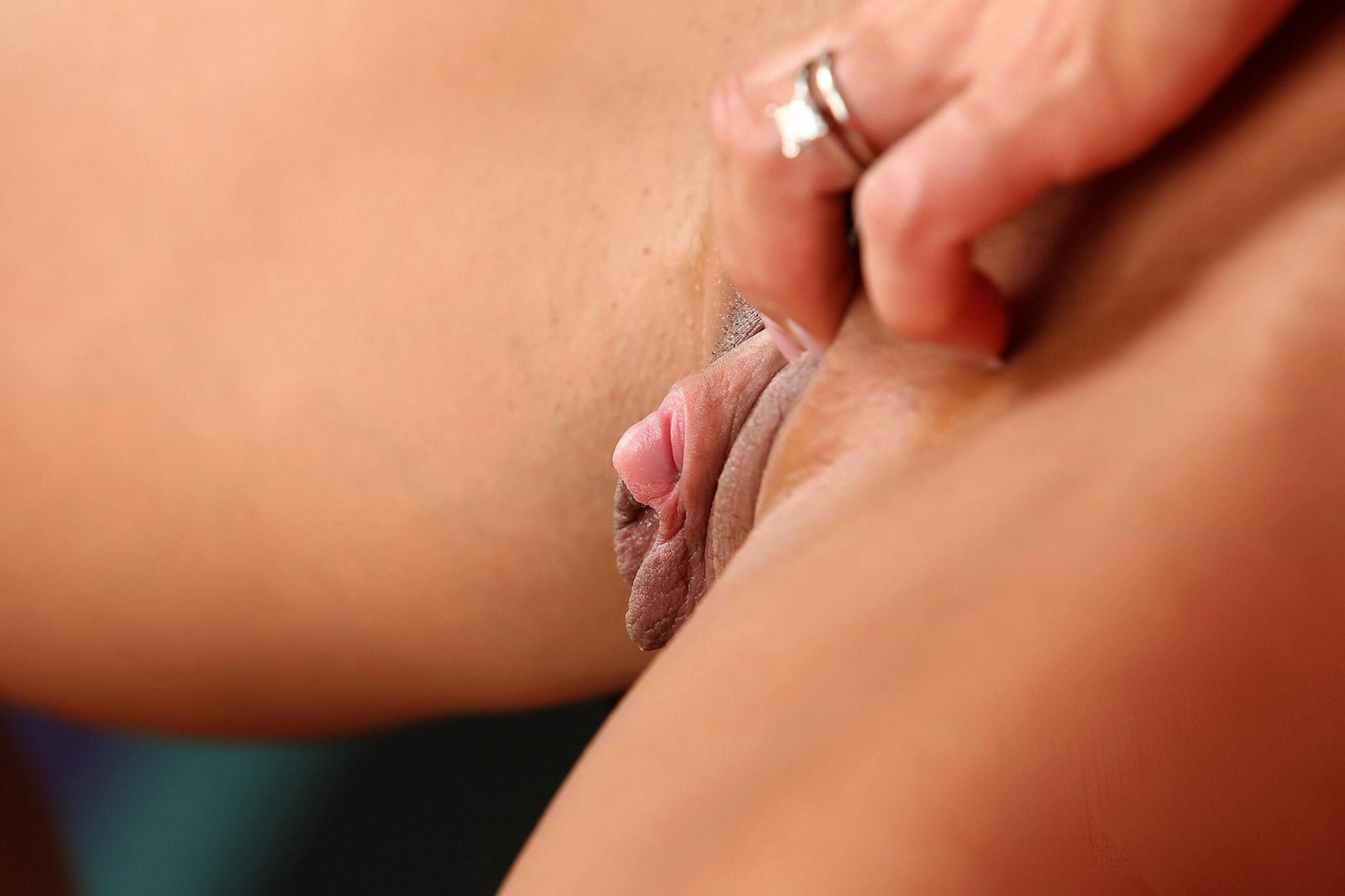
- Example of clitoromegaly
- Specialty: Gynaecology

Clitoromegaly (or macroclitoris) is an abnormal enlargement of the clitoris that is mostly congenital; it is otherwise acquired through deliberately induced clitoral enlargement, a form of body modification, by use of anabolic steroids, in particular testosterone. It can happen as part of a gender transition. It is clinically distinguishable from normal enlargement of the clitoris seen during sexual arousal.

== Presentation ==
Degree of genital ambiguity is commonly measured by the Prader classification, which ranges, in ascending order of masculinisation, from 1: female external genitalia with clitoromegaly through 5: pseudo-phallus looking like normal male external genitalia.

== Causes ==
Clitoromegaly is a rare condition and can be either present by birth or acquired later in life. If present at birth, congenital adrenal hyperplasia can be one of the causes, since in this condition the adrenal gland of the female fetus produces additional androgens and the newborn baby has ambiguous genitalia which are not clearly male or female. In pregnant women who received norethisterone during pregnancy, masculinization of the fetus occurs, resulting in hypertrophy of the clitoris; however, this is rarely seen nowadays due to use of safer progestogens. It can also be caused by the autosomal recessive congenital disorder known as Fraser syndrome.

In acquired clitoromegaly, the main cause is endocrine hormonal imbalance affecting the adult person, including polyendocrine metabolic ovarian syndrome (PMOS) and hyperthecosis. Acquired clitoromegaly may also be caused by pathologies affecting the ovaries and other endocrine glands. These pathologies may include virulent (such as arrhenoblastoma) and neurofibromatosic tumors. Another cause is clitoral cysts. Sometimes there may be no obvious clinical or hormonal reason.

Female bodybuilders and athletes who use androgens, primarily to enhance muscular growth, strength and appearance, may also experience clearly evident enlargement of the clitoris and increases in libido. Women who use testosterone for therapeutic reasons (treating low libido, averting osteoporosis, as part of an anti-depressant regimen, etc.) may experience some enlargement of the clitoris, although the dosages warranted for these conditions are much lower.

Masculinizing hormone therapy causes clitoromegaly, with the maximum growth seen at around two years. In transgender men, it is associated with higher levels of sexual satisfaction. This effect is often referred to as bottom growth in trans communities.

== Anatomy ==
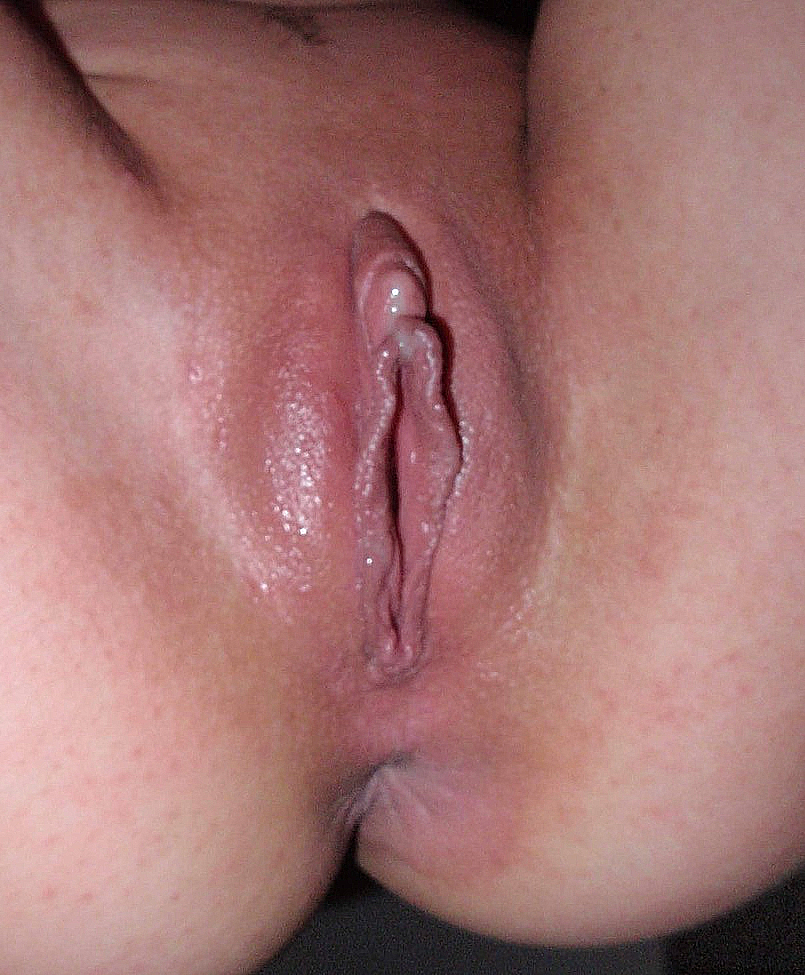
Woman with clitoromegaly

In Atlas of Human Sex Anatomy (1949) by Robert Latou Dickinson, the typical clitoris is defined as having a crosswise measurement of 3 to 4 mm (0.12 - 0.16 inches) and a lengthwise measurement of 4 to 5 mm (0.16 - 0.20 inches). On the other hand, in obstetrics and gynecology medical literature, a frequent definition of clitoromegaly is when there is a clitoral index (product of lengthwise and crosswise measurements) of greater than 35 mm^{2} (0.05 inches^{2}), which is almost twice the size given above for an average sized clitoris.

== Human rights concerns ==
Early surgical reduction of clitoromegaly via full or partial clitoridectomy is controversial, as many that have undergone such treatment have spoken of their loss of physical sensation, and loss of autonomy. In recent years, human rights institutions have criticized early surgical management of such characteristics.

In 2013, it was disclosed in a medical journal that four unnamed elite female athletes from developing countries were required to receive gonadectomies and partial clitoridectomies if they wanted to continue competing after testosterone testing revealed that they had 5α-Reductase 2 deficiency. In April 2016, the United Nations Special Rapporteur on health, Dainius Pūras, condemned this treatment as a form of female genital mutilation "in the absence of symptoms or health issues warranting those procedures."

== See also ==
- Metoidioplasty
- Micropenis
- Pseudo-penis, an enlarged clitoris or other penis-like structure that is normally present in some mammal, bird, and insect species
