= 16α-LE2 =

Chemical compound

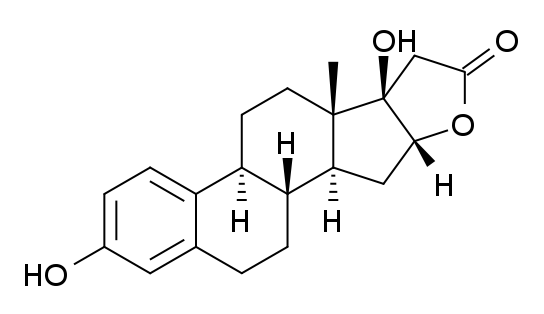

Identifiers
- IUPAC name: 3,17β-Dihydroxy-16α,21-epoxy-19-nor-17α-pregna-1,3,5(10)-trien-21-one
- CAS Number: 406483-39-4
- PubChem CID: 9862250
- ChemSpider: 8037946
- UNII: Z7DNN9U8AE

Chemical and physical data
- Formula: C_{20}H_{24}O_{4}
- Molar mass: 328.408 g·mol^{−1}
- 3D model (JSmol): Interactive image
- SMILES: O=C1O[C@@]2([H])[C@]([C@@]3(C)CC[C@]4([H])C5=CC=C(C=C5CC[C@@]4([H])[C@]3([H])C2)O)(C1)O
- InChI: InChI=InChI=1S/C20H24O4/c1-19-7-6-14-13-5-3-12(21)8-11(13)2-4-15(14)16(19)9-17-20(19,23)10-18(22)24-17/h3,5,8,14-17,21,23H,2,4,6-7,9-10H2,1H3/t14-,15-,16+,17-,19+,20+/m1/s1; Key:NLUGVTJBNRSIKH-UQZPWQSVSA-N

16α-LE2, or 16α-lactone-estradiol, also known as 3,17β-dihydroxy-19-nor-17α-pregna-1,3,5-(10)-triene-21,16α-lactone, is a synthetic, steroidal estrogen featuring an estradiol core. It is a highly potent and selective agonist of the ERα that is used in scientific research to study the function of the ERα. It has 265-fold higher potency in transactivation assays of the ERα relative to the ERβ and 70-fold preference in binding affinity for the ERα over the ERβ.

In rodents, 16α-LE2 has no effect on ovarian follicle development, whereas the highly ERβ-selective agonist 8β-VE2 stimulates follicular growth and to a comparable extent as estradiol, indicating that the ERβ and not the ERα is involved in the effects of estrogen on ovarian follicles. In contrast, 16α-LE2 stimulates uterine weight, whereas 8β-VE2 has no effect, indicating that the ERα and not the ERβ is involved in the effects of estrogen on the uterus. Research has determined through experimental rodent studies with estradiol, 16α-LE2, and 8β-VE2 that the positive, protective effects of estrogens on bone formation resorption and bone mineral density are mediated via the ERα, whereas the ERβ does not appear to be involved.

== See also ==
- ERA-45
- ERA-63
- Propylpyrazoletriol
- Methylpiperidinopyrazole
- GTx-758
- Diarylpropionitrile
- WAY-200070
- 16α-Iodo-E2
