= AU-rich element =

RNA sequences

Adenylate-uridylate-rich elements (AU-rich elements; AREs) are nucleotide sequences found in the 3' untranslated region (UTR) of many messenger RNAs (mRNAs) that code for proto-oncogenes, nuclear transcription factors, and cytokines. AREs are one of the most common determinants of RNA stability in mammalian cells and can also modulate mRNA translation. The function of AREs was originally discovered in 1985 by Gray D. Shaw while in Robert Kamen's research lab at Genetics Institute, when Gray Shaw transferred the ARE from the 3' UTR of the human GM-CSF gene into the 3' UTR of a rabbit beta-globin gene. The transfer of the GM-CSF ARE caused the otherwise stable beta-globin mRNA to rapidly decay. Shaw had previously postulated that the conserved GM-CSF sequences must have a function as they were very similar to the conserved 3' UTR sequences of ATTTA that he had previously observed in mouse and human IFN-alpha genes in 1983 while working in Charles Weissmann's lab at the University of Zurich.

A comparison of the mouse and human cDNAs encoding TNF (aka cachectin) in 1986 revealed that the TNF genes also shared an unusual conserved TTATTTAT sequence in their 3'UTRs, leading to speculation of a regulatory function that might be acting either at the DNA transcription level or at the mRNA level. After the discovery and publication by Shaw that AREs don't function at the DNA level but rather in mRNA, ribonucleotide sequences with frequent adenine and uridine bases in 3' UTR of an mRNA were eventually classified (see description below). While AREs often target the mRNA for rapid degradation, ARE-directed mRNA degradation can be influenced by many exogenous factors that modulate a cell's function, including phorbol esters, calcium ionophores, cytokines, and transcription inhibitors. In 1989, Kruys and Shaw reported that AREs could also function to block the translation of mRNAs, using Xenopus oocytes as the translational assay system. This blockade could be explained by the binding of the ELAVL2 isoform that is found in oocytes to AREs. Further research revealed that AREs could sometimes also function to increase translation of mRNAs by recruiting the microRNP-related proteins FXR1 and AGO2 during conditions of cell cycle arrest. In 2025 it was reported that a synthetic ARE, with a certain configuration of AUUUA repeats that enhance HuR binding, can increase protein expression up to 5-fold. This finding may be useful for many mRNA-based therapeutics. Collectively, all of these observations suggest that receptor signaling and the local changing dynamic conditions within a cell (including starvation and stress) dictates how the ARE of an mRNA will function.

Each of these data observations strongly suggest that AREs play a critical role in the regulation of gene expression during cell growth and differentiation, as well as the immune response. As evidence of its critical role, deletion of the AREs from the 3' UTR in either the TNF gene or GM-CSF gene in mice leads to over expression of each respective gene product, causing dramatic disease phenotypes. In short, the AU-rich element illustrates how after genes are transcribed into mRNA, there is another level of control that can determine how much protein will be translated from an mRNA (posttransciptional gene regulation).

AREs have been divided into three classes with different sequences. The best characterized adenylate uridylate (AU)-rich Elements have a core sequence of AUUUA within U-rich sequences (for example WWWU(AUUUA)UUUW where W is A or U). This lies within a 50–150 base sequence, repeats of the core AUUUA element are often required for function. A single AUUUA shows very little mRNA destabilizing function, whereas AUUUAUUUAUUUA shows some mRNA destabilizing function when inserted into the 3'UTR of a rabbit beta-globin gene.

A number of different proteins (e.g. HuA, HuB, HuC, HuD, HuR) bind to these elements and stabilize the mRNA. The sequence AUUUAUUUA is the minimal sequence required for HuR binding and multiple AUUUA sequences can be inserted at the beginning of the 3' UTR to maximize HuR binding. HuR contains three RNA recognition motifs (RRMs): Tandem RRM1 and 2, followed by a flexible linker and a C-terminal RRM3. The co-crystal structure of RRM3 provides structural and mechanistic insights into how RRM3 in HuR binds to various AU-rich sequences. The RNA binding protein RMB47 has been shown to bind to AREs in IL-10 mRNA and Ectodermal neural cortex 1 (ENC1) mRNA and stabilize those mRNAs. Other ARE binding proteins (AUF1, TTP, BRF1, TIA-1, TIAR, and KSRP) destabilize the mRNA.

There are microRNAs (miRNAs)s that also bind to AREs in a cooperative fashion. For example, the human microRNA, miR16, contains the UAAAUAUU sequence that is complementary to the ARE sequence and appears to be required for ARE-mRNA turnover through association with Ago/eiF2C family members and in concert with TTP. HuD (also called ELAVL4) binds to AREs and increases the half-life of ARE-bearing mRNAs in neurons during brain development and plasticity. The RNA binding protein DDX21 has been reported to bind to AREs and confer mTOR-mediated translation control of cytokines during T cell activation.

AREsite—a database for ARE containing genes—has recently been developed with the aim to provide detailed bioinformatic characterization of AU-rich elements.

== Classifications ==
- Class I ARE elements, like the c-fos gene, have dispersed AUUUA motifs within or near U-rich regions.
- Class II elements, like the GM-CSF gene, have overlapping AUUUA motifs within or near U-rich regions.
- Class III elements, like the c-jun gene, are a much less well-defined class—they have a U-rich region but no AUUUA repeats.

No real ARE consensus sequence has been determined yet, and these categories are based neither on the same biological functions, nor on the homologous proteins.

== Mechanism of ARE-mediated decay ==
AREs are recognized by RNA binding proteins such as tristetraprolin (TTP), AUF1, and Hu Antigen R (HuR). RNA-binding proteins that bind AREs have been termed ARE-BPs and as of 2019, about 20 ARE-BPs have been identified. Although the exact mechanism is not very well understood, recent publications have attempted to propose the action of some of these ARE-BPs. One characteristic of many ARE-BPs is that they can shuttle between the nucleus and cytoplasm and exert different functions to control gene expression based on their subcellular location. AUF1, also known as hnRNP D, binds AREs through RNA recognition motifs (RRMs). AUF1 is also known to interact with the translation initiation factor eIF4G and with poly(A)-binding protein, indicating that AUF1 senses the translational status of mRNA and decays accordingly through the excision of the poly(A) tail.

The proposed mechanism for which ARE elements function & control sequencing.

TTP's (ZFP36's) expression is rapidly induced by insulin. Immunoprecipitation experiments have shown that TTP co-precipitates with an exosome, suggesting that it helps recruit exosomes to the mRNA containing AREs. TTP appears to promote the processive deadenylation activity of CCR4–NOT on mRNAs containing AREs, with phosphorylation-dependent interactions with cytoplasmic poly(A)-binding protein (PABPC1) potentially enhancing deadenylation and promoting regulated mRNA decay. TTP can also repress mRNA translation after binding to AREs by using 4EHP-GYF2 as a cofactor. Alternatively, HuR proteins have a stabilizing effect—their binding to AREs increases the half-life of mRNAs. Similar to other RNA-binding proteins, this class of proteins contain three RRMs, two of which are specific to ARE elements. A likely mechanism for HuR action relies on the idea that these proteins compete with other proteins that normally have a destabilizing effect on mRNAs. HuRs are involved in genotoxic response—they accumulate in the cytoplasm in response to UV exposure and stabilize mRNAs that encode proteins involved in DNA repair.

== Disease ==
Problems with mRNA stability have been identified in viral genomes, cancer cells, and various diseases. Research shows that many of these problems arise because of faulty ARE function. Deficiency of the ZFP36 family show that ZFP36 ARE binding proteins are critical regulators of T cell homeostasis and autoimmunity. Deficient mice have also indicated a protective role for ZFP36 ARE binding proteins via regulating cytokine levels in the thymic microenvironment, thereby preventing thymic involution. Additional potential problems have been listed below:

- The c-fos gene produces a transcription factor that is activated in several cancers, the ARE present in c-fos plays a role in its post-transcriptional regulation.
- c-myc gene, also responsible for producing transcription factors found in several cancers, the ARE present in c-myc plays a role in its post-transcriptional regulation.
- The Cox-2 gene catalyses the production of prostaglandins—it overexpresses in several cancers, and is stabilized by the binding of CUGBP2 RNA-binding protein to ARE
- ZFP36 ARE binding proteins have been reported to play a critical role in mitigating postsurgical pain by tamping down peripheral, central and systemic inflammatory responses.
