= ERA-45 =

Chemical compound

Clinical data
- Drug class: Estrogen; Selective ERα agonist

Identifiers
- CAS Number: 1044260-74-3
- PubChem SID: 472218960

ERA-45 is a synthetic estrogen and a selective agonist of the ERα. It shows 286-fold selectivity for transactivation of the ERα over the ERβ, with EC_{50} values of 0.37 nM for the ERα (7-fold weaker than estradiol) and 13 nM for the ERβ (20,000-fold weaker than estradiol). However, another found only about 35-fold potency for transactivation of the ERα over the ERβ. The drug has no antagonistic activity at either receptor. ERA-45 induced prostate cancer development in preclinical models when it was given in combination with testosterone, whereas testosterone alone did not do so. In contrast, the selective ERβ agonist ERB-26 was protective against the development of prostate cancer produced by these two drugs. These findings suggest opposing roles of the ERα and ERβ in the prostate gland. The chemical structure of ERa-45 does not appear to have been disclosed.

== See also ==
- 16α-LE2
- ERA-63
- GTx-758
- Methylpiperidinopyrazole
- Propylpyrazoletriol
