= C22H30O =

The molecular formula C_{22}H_{30}O (molar mass: 310.47 g/mol, exact mass: 310.2297 u) may refer to:

- Desogestrel
- ERA-63, or ORG-37663
