= PDLIM1 =

Protein-coding gene in the species Homo sapiens

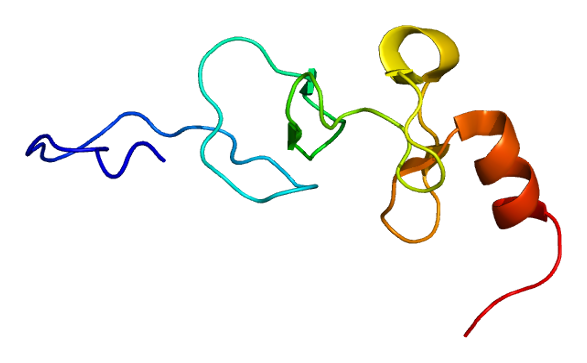

Identifiers
- Aliases: PDLIM1, CLIM1, CLP-36, CLP36, HEL-S-112, hCLIM1, PDZ and LIM domain 1
- External IDs: OMIM: 605900; MGI: 1860611; GeneCards: PDLIM1
Available structures
PDB	Ortholog search: PDBe RCSB
PDB	List of PDB id codes 1X62, 2PKT

Gene location (Human)
Chr.	Chromosome 10 (human)
Band	10q23.33	Start	95,237,572 bp
Band	10q23.33	End	95,291,012 bp

Gene location (Mouse)
Chr.	Chromosome 19 (mouse)
Band	19|19 C3	Start	40,209,617 bp
Band	19|19 C3	End	40,260,286 bp
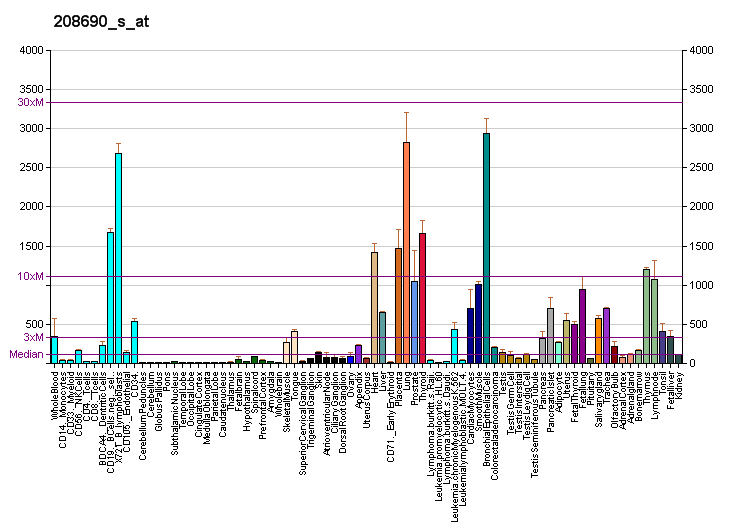
RNA expression pattern
Bgee	Human / Mouse (ortholog); Top expressed in: lower lobe of lung; nasal epithelium; mucosa of urinary bladder; right lung; pericardium; gingival epithelium; upper lobe of lung; olfactory zone of nasal mucosa; palpebral conjunctiva; upper lobe of left lung / Top expressed in: ileum; placenta; jejunum; duodenum; esophagus; colon; uterus; zygote; lens; genital tubercle; More reference expression data
BioGPS	More reference expression data
Gene ontology
Molecular function	transcription coactivator activity; metal ion binding; cadherin binding involved in cell-cell adhesion; actin binding; muscle alpha-actinin binding
Cellular component	cytoplasm; cytoskeleton; focal adhesion; transcription regulator complex; Z discdkac; stress fiber; filamentous actin
Biological process	response to hypoxia; regulation of transcription, DNA-templated; response to oxidative stress; cell-cell adhesion; positive regulation of nucleic acid-templated transcription; development of the heart; actin cytoskeleton organization; muscle structure development
Sources:Amigo / QuickGO
Orthologs
Databases	NCBI: entry; OMA: entry
Species	Human	Mouse
Entrez	9124	54132
Ensembl	ENSG00000107438	ENSMUSG00000055044
UniProt	O00151	O70400
RefSeq (mRNA)	NM_020992	NM_016861
RefSeq (protein)	NP_066272	NP_058557
Location (UCSC)	Chr 10: 95.24 – 95.29 Mb	Chr 19: 40.21 – 40.26 Mb
PubMed search
- Wikidata
View/Edit Human	View/Edit Mouse

PDZ and LIM domain protein 1 is a protein that in humans is encoded by the PDLIM1 gene.

== Interactions ==
PDLIM1 has been shown to interact with:

- Actinin alpha 4,
- Actinin, alpha 1,
- Estrogen receptor alpha, and
- RLIM.
