= 16α-Iodo-E2 =

Chemical compound

Identifiers
- IUPAC name: (8R,9S,13S,14S,16R,17R)-16-iodo-13-methyl-6,7,8,9,11,12,14,15,16,17-decahydrocyclopenta[a]phenanthrene-3,17-diol
- CAS Number: 7450-34-2
- PubChem CID: 67087
- ChemSpider: 60437
- ChEMBL: ChEMBL342892
- CompTox Dashboard (EPA): DTXSID00275695

Chemical and physical data
- Formula: C_{18}H_{23}IO_{2}
- Molar mass: 398.284 g·mol^{−1}
- 3D model (JSmol): Interactive image
- SMILES: C[C@]12CC[C@H]3[C@H]([C@@H]1C[C@H]([C@@H]2O)I)CCC4=C3C=CC(=C4)O
- InChI: InChI=1S/C18H23IO2/c1-18-7-6-13-12-5-3-11(20)8-10(12)2-4-14(13)15(18)9-16(19)17(18)21/h3,5,8,13-17,20-21H,2,4,6-7,9H2,1H3/t13-,14-,15+,16-,17+,18+/m1/s1; Key:SSYGGPAGDDGXAF-ZXXIGWHRSA-N

16α-Iodo-E2, or 16α-iodoestradiol, is a synthetic, steroidal, potent estrogen with slight preference for the ERα over the ERβ that is used in scientific research. The K_{D} of 16α-iodo-E2 for the ERα is 0.6 nM and for the ERβ is 0.24 nM, a 4-fold difference in affinity, whereas estradiol is considered to have similar affinity for the two receptor subtypes. Unlike the case of the much weaker estriol (16α-hydroxyestradiol), 16α-iodo-E2 is considered to be equipotent with estradiol in terms of estrogenic activity. Radiolabeled [16α-^{125}I]iodo-E2 has been employed in imaging to study the estrogen receptor.

== See also ==
- 16α-LE2
- Clomestrone
- Mytatrienediol
- GTx-758
