= DDX50 =

Protein-coding gene in the species Homo sapiens

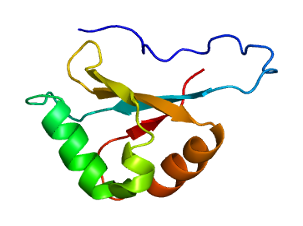

Identifiers
- Aliases: DDX50, GU2, GUB, RH-II/GuB, mcdrh, DEAD-box helicase 50, DExD-box helicase 50
- External IDs: OMIM: 610373; MGI: 2182303; GeneCards: DDX50
Available structures
| PDB | Ortholog search: PDBe RCSB |
| PDB | List of PDB id codes 2E29 |
Enzyme activity
| EC # | BRENDA | ExPASy | KEGG | MetaCyc |
|---|---|---|---|---|
| 3.6.4.13 | ↗ | ↗ | ↗ | ↗ |

Gene location (Human)
| Chr. | Chromosome 10 (human) |
| Band | 10q22.1 | Start | 68,901,286 bp |
| Band | 10q22.1 | End | 68,946,847 bp |

Gene location (Mouse)
| Chr. | Chromosome 10 (mouse) |
| Band | 10|10 B4 | Start | 62,451,674 bp |
| Band | 10|10 B4 | End | 62,486,997 bp |
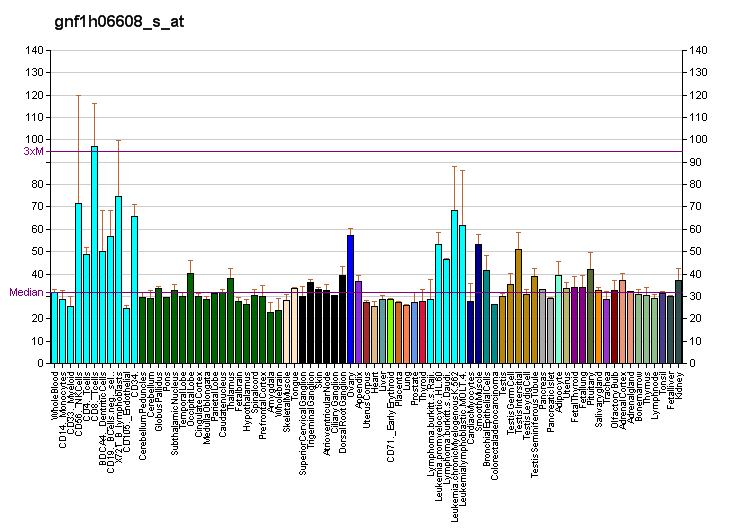

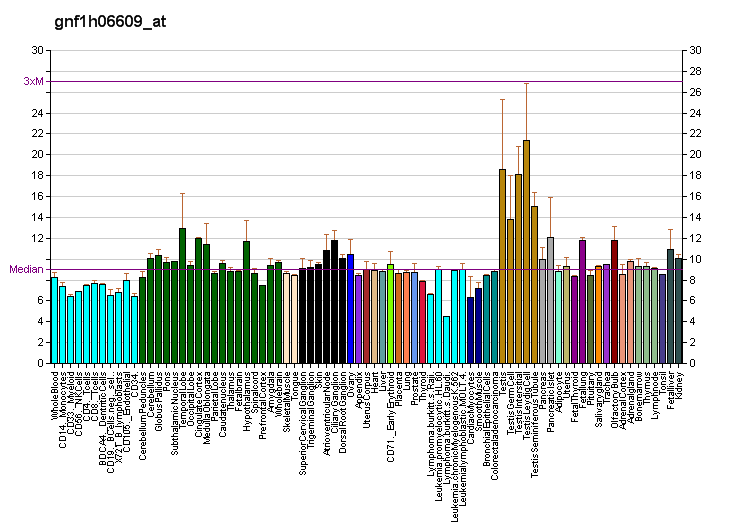
RNA expression pattern
| Bgee | Human / Mouse (ortholog); Top expressed in: cartilage tissue; Achilles tendon; tendon of biceps brachii; gonad; secondary oocyte; ventricular zone; parietal pleura; pericardium; Skeletal muscle tissue of rectus abdominis; tibia / Top expressed in: vestibular sensory epithelium; renal corpuscle; dermis; ureter; submandibular gland; maxillary prominence; mandibular prominence; retinal pigment epithelium; seminal vesicula; islet of Langerhans; More reference expression data |
| BioGPS | More reference expression data |
Gene ontology
| Molecular function | nucleotide binding; hydrolase activity; ATP binding; helicase activity; nucleic acid binding; RNA binding |
| Cellular component | plasma membrane; membrane; nucleus; nucleolus; cytoplasm |
| Biological process | RNA secondary structure unwinding |
Sources:Amigo / QuickGO
Orthologs
| Databases | NCBI: entry; OMA: entry |
| Species | Human | Mouse |
| Entrez | 79009 | 94213 |
| Ensembl | ENSG00000107625 | ENSMUSG00000020076 |
| UniProt | Q9BQ39 | Q99MJ9 |
| RefSeq (mRNA) | NM_024045 | NM_053183; NM_001358819; NM_001358820 |
| RefSeq (protein) | NP_076950 | NP_444413; NP_001345748; NP_001345749 |
| Location (UCSC) | Chr 10: 68.9 – 68.95 Mb | Chr 10: 62.45 – 62.49 Mb |
| PubMed search |
- Wikidata
| View/Edit Human | View/Edit Mouse |

ATP-dependent RNA helicase DDX50 is an enzyme that in humans is encoded by the DDX50 gene.

DEAD box proteins, characterized by the conserved motif Asp-Glu-Ala-Asp (DEAD), are putative RNA helicases. They are implicated in a number of cellular processes involving alteration of RNA secondary structure such as translation initiation, nuclear and mitochondrial splicing, and ribosome and spliceosome assembly. Based on their distribution patterns, some members of this DEAD box protein family are believed to be involved in embryogenesis, spermatogenesis, and cellular growth and division. This gene encodes a DEAD box enzyme that may be involved in ribosomal RNA synthesis or processing. This gene and DDX21, also called RH-II/GuA, have similar genomic structures and are in tandem orientation on chromosome 10, suggesting that the two genes arose by gene duplication in evolution. This gene has pseudogenes on chromosomes 2, 3 and 4. Alternative splicing of this gene generates multiple transcript variants, but the full length nature of all the other variants but one has not been defined.
