= SAFB2 =

Protein-coding gene in the species Homo sapiens

Identifiers
- Aliases: SAFB2, scaffold attachment factor B2
- External IDs: OMIM: 608066; MGI: 2146808; GeneCards: SAFB2

Gene location (Human)
Chr.	Chromosome 19 (human)
Band	19p13.3	Start	5,586,999 bp
Band	19p13.3	End	5,624,046 bp

Gene location (Mouse)
Chr.	Chromosome 17 (mouse)
Band	17|17 D	Start	56,560,965 bp
Band	17|17 D	End	56,584,585 bp
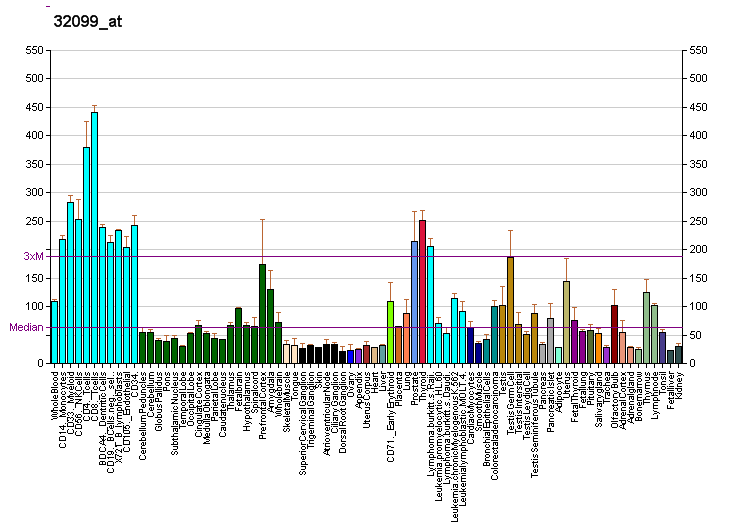

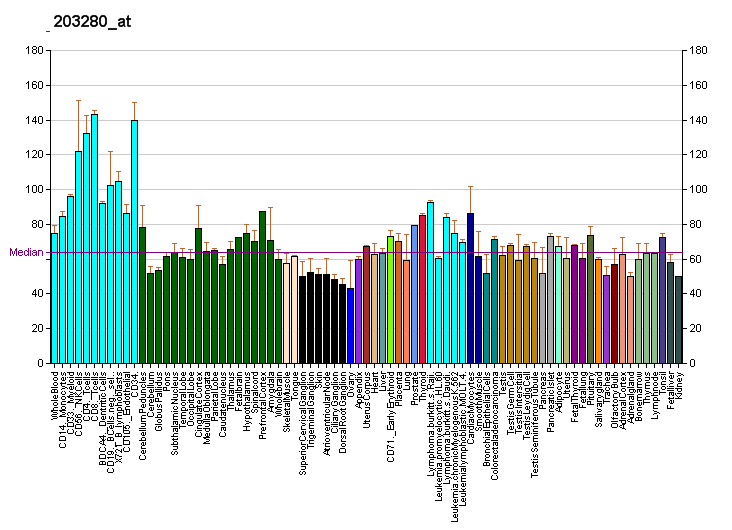
RNA expression pattern
Bgee	Human / Mouse (ortholog); Top expressed in: right hemisphere of cerebellum; anterior pituitary; right uterine tube; left ovary; right ovary; sural nerve; canal of the cervix; body of uterus; right lobe of thyroid gland; left lobe of thyroid gland / Top expressed in: neural layer of retina; granulocyte; ventricular zone; yolk sac; superior frontal gyrus; tail of embryo; thymus; lip; primary visual cortex; muscle of thigh; More reference expression data
BioGPS	More reference expression data
Gene ontology
Molecular function	DNA binding; nucleic acid binding; identical protein binding; protein binding; double-stranded DNA binding; RNA binding; sequence-specific DNA binding
Cellular component	extracellular exosome; nucleoplasm; cytoplasm; intracellular membrane-bounded organelle; nucleus; nuclear body
Biological process	regulation of transcription, DNA-templated; transcription, DNA-templated; Sertoli cell differentiation; regulation of transcription by RNA polymerase II; regulation of androgen receptor signaling pathway; regulation of mRNA processing
Sources:Amigo / QuickGO
Orthologs
Databases	NCBI: entry; OMA: entry
Species	Human	Mouse
Entrez	9667	224902
Ensembl	ENSG00000130254	ENSMUSG00000042625
UniProt	Q14151	Q80YR5
RefSeq (mRNA)	NM_014649	NM_001029979; NM_001355463
RefSeq (protein)	NP_055464	NP_001025150; NP_001342392
Location (UCSC)	Chr 19: 5.59 – 5.62 Mb	Chr 17: 56.56 – 56.58 Mb
PubMed search
- Wikidata
View/Edit Human	View/Edit Mouse

Scaffold attachment factor B2 is a protein that in humans is encoded by the SAFB2 gene.

== Interactions ==
SAFB2 has been shown to interact with Estrogen receptor alpha and SAFB.
