= LMO2 =

Protein-coding gene in the species Homo sapiens

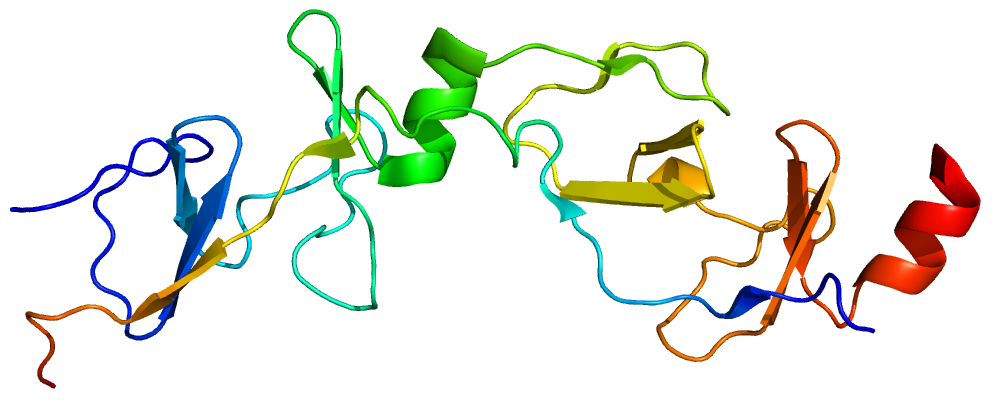

Identifiers
- Aliases: LMO2, RBTN2, RBTNL1, RHOM2, TTG2, LIM domain only 2, LMO-2
- External IDs: OMIM: 180385; MGI: 102811; GeneCards: LMO2
Available structures
PDB	Ortholog search: PDBe RCSB
PDB	List of PDB id codes 2XJY, 2XJZ, 2YPA, 4KFZ

Gene location (Human)
Chr.	Chromosome 11 (human)
Band	11p13	Start	33,858,576 bp
Band	11p13	End	33,892,076 bp

Gene location (Mouse)
Chr.	Chromosome 2 (mouse)
Band	2 E2|2 54.46 cM	Start	103,788,331 bp
Band	2 E2|2 54.46 cM	End	103,812,223 bp
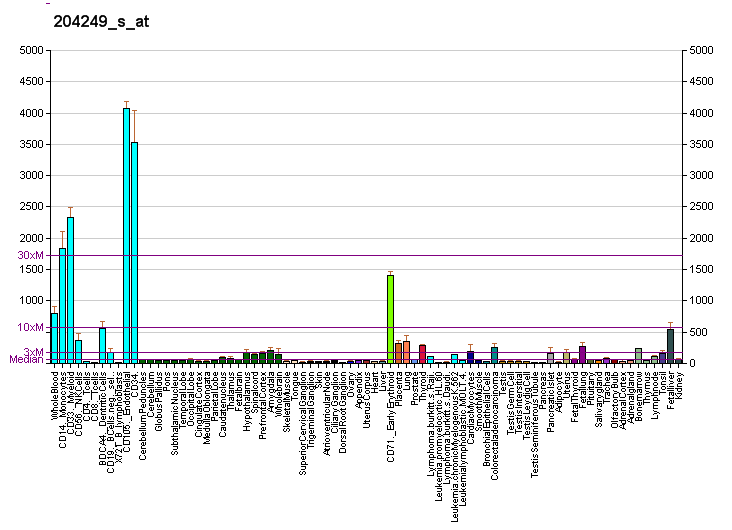
RNA expression pattern
Bgee	Human / Mouse (ortholog); Top expressed in: monocyte; tendon of biceps brachii; trabecular bone; urethra; endothelial cell; vena cava; inferior ganglion of vagus nerve; glutes; internal globus pallidus; synovial membrane / Top expressed in: fetal liver hematopoietic progenitor cell; blood; spleen; tibiofemoral joint; human fetus; external carotid artery; parotid gland; tail of embryo; granulocyte; bone marrow; More reference expression data
BioGPS	More reference expression data
Gene ontology
Molecular function	DNA-binding transcription activator activity, RNA polymerase II-specific; DNA-binding transcription factor activity, RNA polymerase II-specific; bHLH transcription factor binding; E-box binding; protein binding; RNA polymerase II transcription regulatory region sequence-specific DNA binding; metal ion binding
Cellular component	nucleus; transcription regulator complex; nucleoplasm
Biological process	multicellular organism development; mRNA transcription by RNA polymerase II; positive regulation of transcription by RNA polymerase II; cellular response to thyroid hormone stimulus; regulation of hematopoietic stem cell differentiation
Sources:Amigo / QuickGO
Orthologs
Databases	NCBI: entry; OMA: entry
Species	Human	Mouse
Entrez	4005	16909
Ensembl	ENSG00000135363	ENSMUSG00000032698
UniProt	P25791	P25801
RefSeq (mRNA)	NM_001142315; NM_001142316; NM_005574	NM_001142335; NM_001142336; NM_001142337; NM_008505
RefSeq (protein)	NP_001135787; NP_001135788; NP_005565	NP_001135807; NP_001135808; NP_001135809; NP_032531
Location (UCSC)	Chr 11: 33.86 – 33.89 Mb	Chr 2: 103.79 – 103.81 Mb
PubMed search
- Wikidata
View/Edit Human	View/Edit Mouse

LIM domain only 2 (rhombotin-like 1), also known as LMO2, RBTNL1, RBTN2, RHOM2, LIM Domain Only Protein 2, TTG2, and T-Cell Translocation Protein 2, is a protein which in humans is encoded by the LMO2 gene.

== Structure ==
LMO2 is characterized as a small, cysteine-rich protein comprising two tandem LIM domains. Each LIM domain features a conserved double zinc finger motif, wherein zinc ions are coordinated by cysteine and histidine residues. These domains are critical for LMO2's primary function as a scaffolding protein facilitating protein-protein interactions within transcriptional regulatory complexes. Notably, LMO2 lacks an intrinsic DNA-binding domain; its influence on gene expression is mediated through its recruitment into multi-protein assemblies. The inter-domain linker region contributes to the protein's overall conformational dynamics, potentially modulating its interaction with diverse binding partners. The structural integrity conferred by the zinc fingers within the LIM domains is essential for maintaining the protein's functional architecture in the context of hematopoiesis and leukemogenesis.

== Function ==
LMO2 encodes a cysteine-rich, two LIM domain protein that is required for yolk sac erythropoiesis. The LMO2 protein has a central and crucial role in hematopoietic development and is highly conserved.

== Clinical significance ==
Aberrant LMO2 expression is a significant feature of T cell acute lymphoblastic leukaemia with multiple described mechanisms of activation. The LMO2 transcription start site is located approximately 25 kb downstream from the 11p13 T-cell translocation cluster (11p13 ttc), where a number of T-cell acute lymphoblastic leukemia-specific translocations occur. An upstream noncoding DNA element is also the site of recurrent mutations in T cell acute lymphoblastic leukaemia, leading the recruitment of the transcription factor MYB and significant H3K27ac enrichment and thus the formation of an aberrant enhancer which up-regulates the expression of LMO2 Furthermore, recurrent and somatically acquired mutations of LMO2 intron 1 lead to its over-expression in both adult and paediatric T cell acute lymphoblastic leukaemia. These mutations introduce new transcription factor binding sites for MYB, ETS1 and RUNX1 allowing for the formation of an aberrant promoter which drives LMO2 expression.

== Interactions ==
LMO2 has been shown to interact with:

- GATA1,
- GATA2,
- JARID1A,
- MLLT4, and
- TAL1
