= SAFB =

Protein-coding gene in the species Homo sapiens

Identifiers
- Aliases: SAFB, HAP, HET, SAF-B1, SAFB1, SAB-B1, SAF-B, scaffold attachment factor B
- External IDs: OMIM: 602895; MGI: 2146974; GeneCards: SAFB

Gene location (Human)
Chr.	Chromosome 19 (human)
Band	19p13.3	Start	5,623,035 bp
Band	19p13.3	End	5,668,478 bp

Gene location (Mouse)
Chr.	Chromosome 17 (mouse)
Band	17|17 D	Start	56,891,825 bp
Band	17|17 D	End	56,913,294 bp
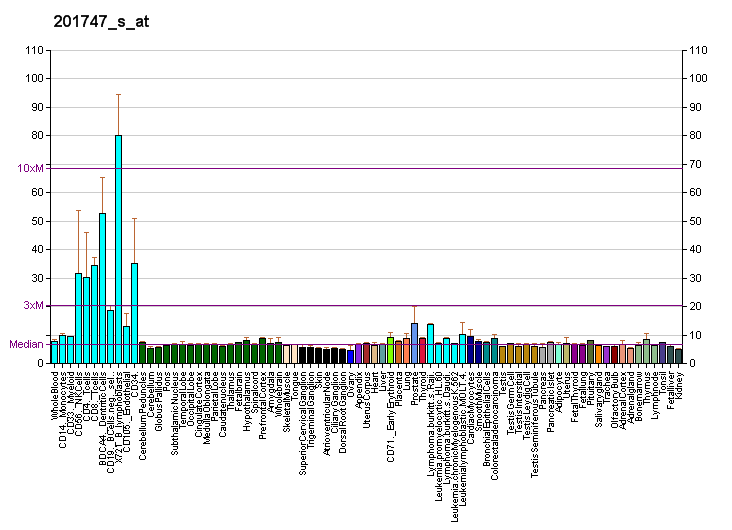

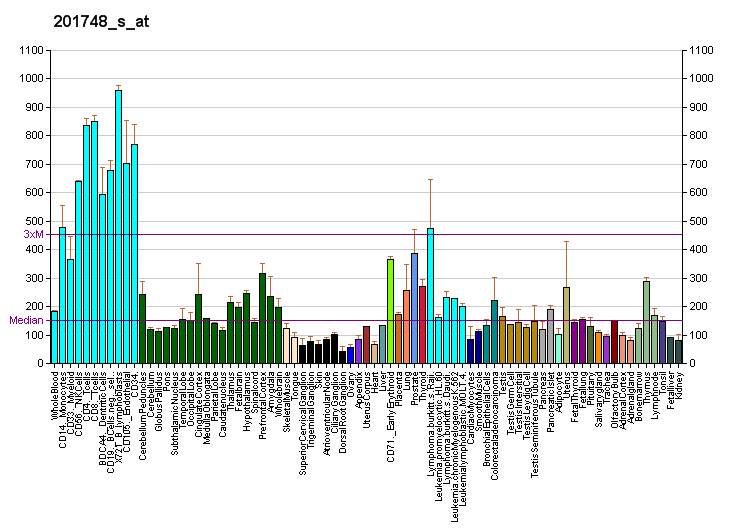
RNA expression pattern
Bgee	Human / Mouse (ortholog); Top expressed in: sural nerve; right uterine tube; canal of the cervix; ventricular zone; right hemisphere of cerebellum; right ovary; left ovary; body of uterus; skin of leg; skin of abdomen / Top expressed in: neural layer of retina; tail of embryo; renal corpuscle; ventricular zone; genital tubercle; yolk sac; medullary collecting duct; thymus; dentate gyrus of hippocampal formation granule cell; granulocyte; More reference expression data
BioGPS	More reference expression data
Gene ontology
Molecular function	DNA binding; chromatin binding; protein binding; nucleic acid binding; double-stranded DNA binding; sequence-specific DNA binding; RNA binding; RNA polymerase II cis-regulatory region sequence-specific DNA binding
Cellular component	nucleoplasm; nucleus
Biological process	regulation of transcription, DNA-templated; chromatin organization; transcription, DNA-templated; hormone metabolic process; positive regulation of transcription by RNA polymerase II; regulation of transcription by RNA polymerase II; intracellular estrogen receptor signaling pathway; regulation of mRNA processing; growth; regulation of growth
Sources:Amigo / QuickGO
Orthologs
Databases	NCBI: entry; OMA: entry
Species	Human	Mouse
Entrez	6294	224903
Ensembl	ENSG00000160633	ENSMUSG00000071054
UniProt	Q15424	D3YXK2
RefSeq (mRNA)	NM_001201338; NM_001201339; NM_001201340; NM_002967; NM_001320571 NM_001320572	NM_001163300; NM_001374619
RefSeq (protein)	NP_001188267; NP_001188268; NP_001188269; NP_001307500; NP_001307501 NP_002958	NP_001156772; NP_001361548
Location (UCSC)	Chr 19: 5.62 – 5.67 Mb	Chr 17: 56.89 – 56.91 Mb
PubMed search
- Wikidata
View/Edit Human	View/Edit Mouse

Scaffold attachment factor B, also known as SAFB, is a gene with homologs that have been studied in humans and mice.

== Function ==
This gene encodes a DNA-binding protein that has specificity for scaffold or matrix attachment region DNA elements (S/MAR DNA). This protein is thought to be involved in attaching the base of chromatin loops to the nuclear matrix but there are conflicting views as to whether this protein is a component of chromatin, the nuclear matrix, or both. Scaffold attachment factors are a subset of nuclear matrix proteins (NMP) with enriched binding to AT-rich S/MAR sequences. The SAF-B protein is thought to serve as a molecular base to assemble a 'transcriptosome complex' in the vicinity of actively transcribed genes. It is involved in the regulation of the heat shock protein 27 transcription and also can act as an estrogen receptor corepressor. This gene is a candidate gene for breast tumorigenesis.

== Interactions ==
SAFB has been shown to interact with:

- Estrogen receptor alpha,
- HNRPD,
- SAFB2, and
- TAF15.
