= GTx-758 =

Chemical compound

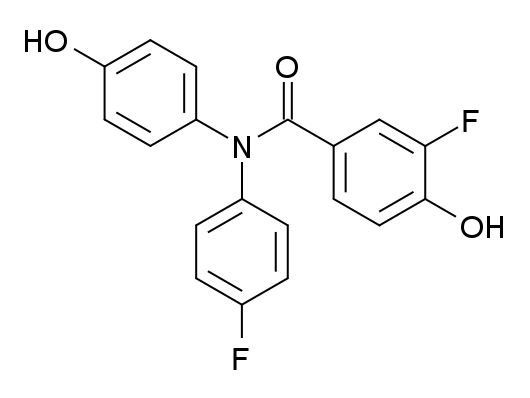

Clinical data
- Other names: Capesaris
- Routes of administration: By mouth

Legal status
- Legal status: US: Investigational New Drug

Identifiers
- IUPAC name: 3-fluoro-N-(4-fluorophenyl)-4-hydroxy-N-(4-hydroxyphenyl)benzamide
- CAS Number: 938067-78-8
- PubChem CID: 46861578
- ChemSpider: 34954411
- UNII: 406GR1485Z
- ChEMBL: ChEMBL3545017
- CompTox Dashboard (EPA): DTXSID401045796

Chemical and physical data
- Formula: C_{19}H_{13}F_{2}NO_{3}
- Molar mass: 341.314 g·mol^{−1}
- 3D model (JSmol): Interactive image
- SMILES: C1=CC(=CC=C1N(C2=CC=C(C=C2)F)C(=O)C3=CC(=C(C=C3)O)F)O
- InChI: InChI=1S/C19H13F2NO3/c20-13-2-4-14(5-3-13)22(15-6-8-16(23)9-7-15)19(25)12-1-10-18(24)17(21)11-12/h1-11,23-24H; Key:FBCQEUMZZNVQKD-UHFFFAOYSA-N

GTx-758 (tentative brand name Capesaris) is a synthetic nonsteroidal estrogen which was under development by GTx, Inc. for the treatment of advanced prostate cancer. As of 2016, it had completed two phase II clinical trials.

== Pharmacology ==
=== Pharmacodynamics ===
GTx-758 acts as a selective agonist of the estrogen receptor (ER), with a more than 10-fold preference for activation of ERα relative to ERβ (EC_{50} = 2.1 and 27 nM, respectively). The selectivity of GTx-758 for ERα over ERβ may confer reduced hypercoagulability and thrombophilia, as estradiol directly produces these effects in platelets via activation of ERβ, which is the predominant isoform of the ER expressed in platelets. It has been said that suppression of free testosterone levels by ERα activation-induced increase in hepatic sex hormone-binding globulin (SHBG) production is the primary mechanism of action of GTx-758 in the treatment of prostate cancer.

== Chemistry ==
GTx-758 is a diphenyl benzamide and has a similar structure to triphenylethylene derivatives like chlorotrianisene and clomifene.

== Research ==
=== Preclinical studies ===
In animal studies, GTx-758 reversibly suppresses testosterone concentrations to castrate levels, reduces prostate size and levels of prostate-specific antigen (PSA), but does not induce typical side effects associated with hyperestrogenism (or hypoestrogenism) including hot flashes, bone loss, thrombophilia, hypercoagulation, or increased body fat. Unlike diethylstilbestrol, GTx-758 also does not induce gynecomastia in male monkeys, despite similarly suppressing testosterone levels to the castrate range (≤50 ng/dL) and markedly reducing PSA levels.

=== Clinical studies ===
In a phase II clinical trial of 1000 mg/day and 2000 mg/day GTx-758 versus leuprorelin for the treatment of prostate cancer, GTx-758 suppressed total testosterone levels to a lower extent than leuprorelin but decreased free testosterone and PSA levels to a greater extent, suggesting superior effectiveness. GTx-758 increased median SHBG levels by 495% (at 1000 mg/day) and 583% (at 2000 mg/day), which was considered to account for the greater relative decrease in levels of free testosterone. There was a significantly lesser incidence of estrogen deficiency-associated side effects in the GTx-758 group. For instance, there was a more than 4-fold lower incidence of hot flashes for GTx-758, C-terminal telopeptide (CTX) and bone specific alkaline phosphatase (BSAP) levels (markers of bone turnover) increased in the leuprorelin group but decreased in the GTx-758 group (indicating a beneficial bone-sparing effect for GTx-758), and insulin-like growth factor-1 levels (which are positively associated with insulin resistance and metabolic syndrome as well as progression of prostate cancer) increased in the leuprorelin group but decreased in the GTx-758 group. Incidence of gynecomastia was not reported with GTx-758. However, a higher incidence of venous thromboembolism (VTE) was observed with GTx-78 (4.1%) relative to leuprorelin (0.0%), and this led to early termination of the clinical trial. The drug was said to be well tolerated aside from VTE. Studies are underway with lower doses of GTx-758 as secondary hormonal therapy in prostate cancer to see if such doses minimize the incidence of VTE.

In a subsequent phase II clinical trial of 150 mg/day and 250 mg/day GTx-758 in castration-resistant prostate cancer, GTx-758 increased median SHBG levels by 301% (with 250 mg/day), decreased free testosterone levels by median 44%, and decreased PSA levels. Similarly to the prior phase II clinical trial, GTx-758 was regarded as well tolerated, and improved bone parameters, but there were still two possibly drug-related severe adverse effects (VTE and myocardial infarction).

== See also ==
- 16α-LE2
- ERA-45
- ERA-63
- Propylpyrazoletriol
