= Testicular receptor =

Members of the nuclear receptor family of intracellular transcription factors

nuclear receptor subfamily 2, group C, member 1

Identifiers
- Symbol: NR2C1
- Alt. symbols: TR2
- NCBI gene: 7181
- HGNC: 7971
- OMIM: 601529
- RefSeq: NM_003297
- UniProt: P13056

Other data
- Locus: Chr. 12 q22
Search for
- Structures: Swiss-model
- Domains: InterPro

nuclear receptor subfamily 2, group C, member 2

Identifiers
- Symbol: NR2C2
- Alt. symbols: TR4
- NCBI gene: 7182
- HGNC: 7972
- OMIM: 601426
- RefSeq: NM_003298
- UniProt: P49116

Other data
- Locus: Chr. 3 p25
Search for
- Structures: Swiss-model
- Domains: InterPro

The testicular receptor proteins are members of the nuclear receptor family of intracellular transcription factors. There are two forms of the receptor, TR2 and TR4, each encode by a separate gene (NR2C1 and NR2C2 respectively). These two receptors are considered orphan receptors, but have important functions as transcription factors. In their role as transcription factors, TR2 and TR4 frequently bind to each other form a heterodimer. For example, as a heterodimer they have an important role in determining what types of hemoglobin are produced in the body.

== Historical members ==
Testicular Receptor 3 previously referred to the orphan receptor NR4A1, but it was determined to be part of a different subfamily of nuclear receptors.
