= Testicular receptor 2 =

Human protein-coding gene

NR2C1

Identifiers
- Aliases: NR2C1, TR2, Testicular receptor 2, nuclear receptor subfamily 2 group C member 1
- External IDs: OMIM: 601529; MGI: 1352465; GeneCards: NR2C1

Gene location (Human)
Chr.	Chromosome 12 (human)
Band	12q22	Start	95,020,229 bp
Band	12q22	End	95,073,628 bp

Gene location (Mouse)
Chr.	Chromosome 10 (mouse)
Band	10 C2|10 48.81 cM	Start	93,983,885 bp
Band	10 C2|10 48.81 cM	End	94,033,073 bp
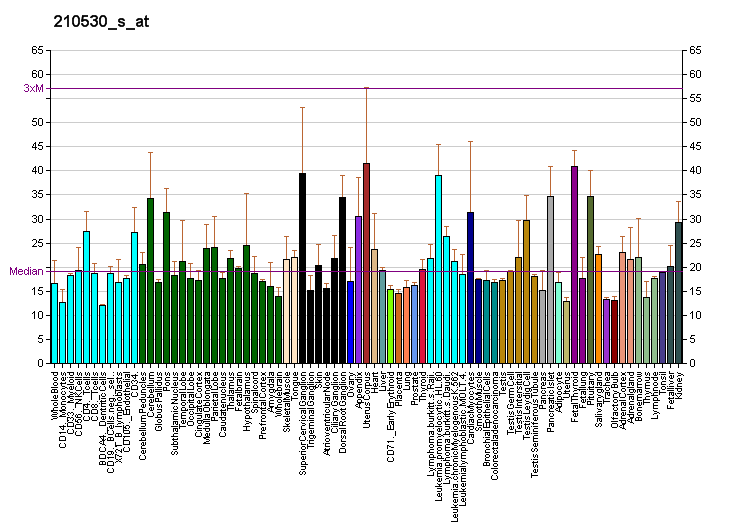

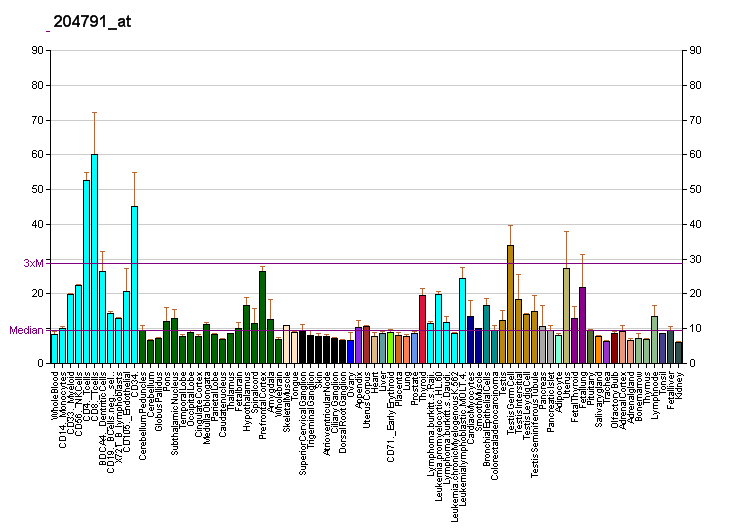

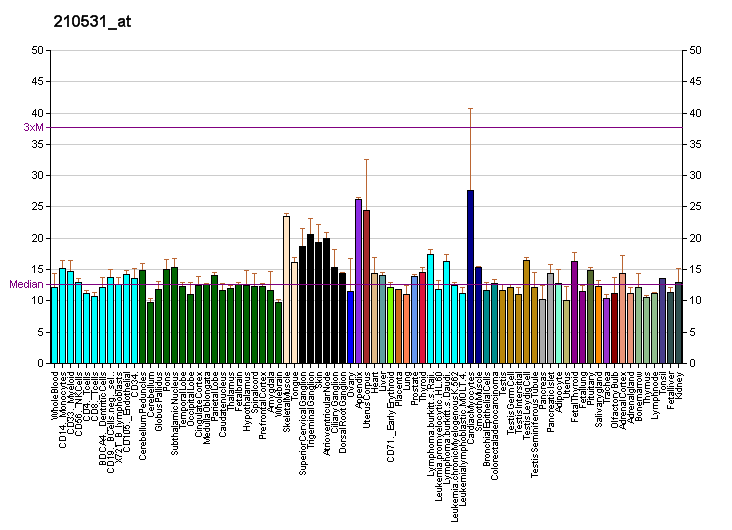
RNA expression pattern
Bgee	Human / Mouse (ortholog); Top expressed in: cerebellar hemisphere; right hemisphere of cerebellum; left lobe of thyroid gland; right lung; tibial nerve; muscle of thigh; sural nerve; right lobe of thyroid gland; right lobe of liver; gastric mucosa / Top expressed in: spermatid; spermatocyte; seminal vesicula; corneal stroma; otic vesicle; male urethra; secondary oocyte; genital tubercle; seminiferous tubule; tail of embryo; More reference expression data
BioGPS	More reference expression data
Gene ontology
Molecular function	sequence-specific DNA binding; protein homodimerization activity; DNA-binding transcription factor activity; zinc ion binding; histone deacetylase binding; metal ion binding; RNA polymerase II cis-regulatory region sequence-specific DNA binding; steroid hormone receptor activity; DNA-binding transcription repressor activity, RNA polymerase II-specific; protein binding; DNA binding; DNA-binding transcription factor activity, RNA polymerase II-specific; signaling receptor activity
Cellular component	PML body; nucleoplasm; nucleus
Biological process	regulation of transcription, DNA-templated; negative regulation of transcription by RNA polymerase II; transcription, DNA-templated; positive regulation of retinoic acid receptor signaling pathway; transcription initiation from RNA polymerase II promoter; negative regulation of transcription, DNA-templated; steroid hormone mediated signaling pathway; signal transduction
Sources:Amigo / QuickGO
Orthologs
Databases	NCBI: entry; OMA: entry
Species	Human	Mouse
Entrez	7181	22025
Ensembl	ENSG00000120798	ENSMUSG00000005897
UniProt	P13056	Q505F1
RefSeq (mRNA)	NM_001032287; NM_001127362; NM_003297	NM_011629
RefSeq (protein)	NP_001027458; NP_001120834; NP_003288; NP_003288.2	NP_035759
Location (UCSC)	Chr 12: 95.02 – 95.07 Mb	Chr 10: 93.98 – 94.03 Mb
PubMed search
- Wikidata
View/Edit Human	View/Edit Mouse

The testicular receptor 2 (TR2) also known as NR2C1 (nuclear receptor subfamily 2, group C, member 1) is a protein that in humans is encoded by the NR2C1 gene. TR2 is a member of the nuclear receptor family of transcription factors, and is currently considered an orphan receptor. TR2 combines with 3 other transcription factors, testicular receptor 4, DNMT1, and KDM1A, to form the so called DRED complex (direct repeat erythroid determinant). This complex acts a repressor that regulates globin protein expression in the production of red blood cells, and in particular is involved in the transition from fetal to adult expression patterns.

== Interactions ==
Testicular receptor 2 has been shown to interact with:

- Androgen receptor,
- Estrogen receptor alpha,
- HDAC3, and
- HDAC4.

== See also ==
- Testicular receptor
