= Testicular receptor 4 =

Protein-coding gene in the species Homo sapiens

NR2C2

Identifiers
- Aliases: NR2C2, TAK1, TR4, Testicular receptor 4, nuclear receptor subfamily 2 group C member 2
- External IDs: OMIM: 601426; MGI: 1352466; GeneCards: NR2C2
Available structures
PDB	Ortholog search: PDBe RCSB
PDB	List of PDB id codes 3P0U

Gene location (Human)
Chr.	Chromosome 3 (human)
Band	3p25.1	Start	14,947,583 bp
Band	3p25.1	End	15,053,600 bp

Gene location (Mouse)
Chr.	Chromosome 6 (mouse)
Band	6|6 D1	Start	92,068,371 bp
Band	6|6 D1	End	92,151,275 bp
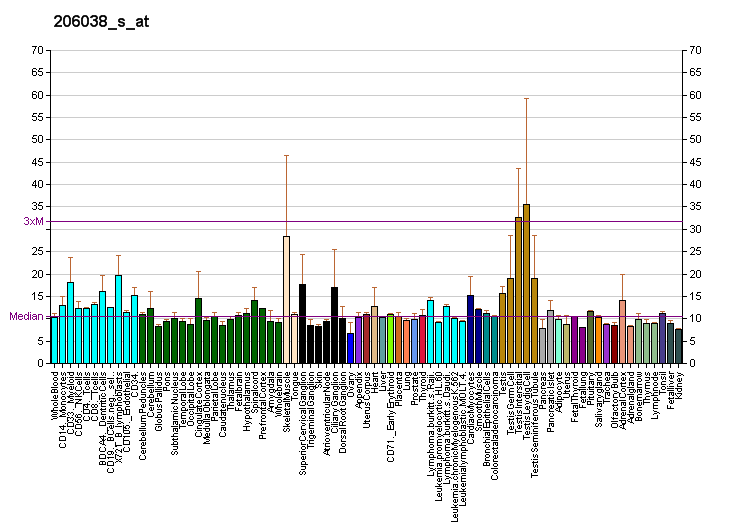
RNA expression pattern
Bgee	Human / Mouse (ortholog); Top expressed in: sural nerve; skin of thigh; tibia; skin of hip; epithelium of colon; jejunal mucosa; superficial temporal artery; epithelium of nasopharynx; ganglionic eminence; parietal pleura / Top expressed in: Rostral migratory stream; spermatocyte; dentate gyrus of hippocampal formation granule cell; genital tubercle; ventromedial nucleus; lateral septal nucleus; lumbar subsegment of spinal cord; supraoptic nucleus; ventricular zone; superior frontal gyrus; More reference expression data
BioGPS	More reference expression data
Gene ontology
Molecular function	sequence-specific DNA binding; DNA binding; DNA-binding transcription factor activity; transcription coactivator activity; zinc ion binding; metal ion binding; steroid hormone receptor activity; protein binding; protein heterodimerization activity; RNA polymerase II transcription regulatory region sequence-specific DNA binding; RNA polymerase II cis-regulatory region sequence-specific DNA binding; DNA-binding transcription activator activity, RNA polymerase II-specific; DNA-binding transcription factor activity, RNA polymerase II-specific; signaling receptor activity
Cellular component	nucleoplasm; nucleus
Biological process	cell differentiation; regulation of transcription, DNA-templated; nervous system development; transcription, DNA-templated; spermatogenesis; transcription initiation from RNA polymerase II promoter; positive regulation of transcription by RNA polymerase II; steroid hormone mediated signaling pathway; signal transduction
Sources:Amigo / QuickGO
Orthologs
Databases	NCBI: entry; OMA: entry
Species	Human	Mouse
Entrez	7182	22026
Ensembl	ENSG00000177463	ENSMUSG00000005893
UniProt	P49116	P49117
RefSeq (mRNA)	NM_001291694; NM_003298	NM_011630; NM_001347342
RefSeq (protein)	NP_001278623; NP_003289	NP_001334271; NP_035760
Location (UCSC)	Chr 3: 14.95 – 15.05 Mb	Chr 6: 92.07 – 92.15 Mb
PubMed search
- Wikidata
View/Edit Human	View/Edit Mouse

Testicular receptor 4 also known as NR2C2 (nuclear receptor subfamily 2, group C, member 2) is a protein that in humans is encoded by the NR2C2 gene.

The testicular receptor 4 is a member of the nuclear receptor family of transcription factors. Though currently considered an orphan receptor, it nevertheless has an important role as a core DNA binding component of the so called DRED complex (direct repeat erythroid determinant). This complex is formed out of TR4, testicular receptor 2, DNMT1, and KDM1A, and functions as a gene repressor the regulates the expression of red blood cell globin. In particular, it contributes to the transition from fetal to adult pattern expression.

== Interactions ==
Testicular receptor 4 has been shown to interact with

- Androgen receptor,
- Estrogen receptor alpha, and
- Hepatocyte nuclear factor 4 alpha.

== See also ==
- Testicular receptor
