= AREsite =

Database of AU-rich elements

Content
- Description: comprehensive investigation of AU-rich elements.

Contact
- Research center: University of Vienna
- Primary citation: PMID 21071424
- Release date: 2010

Access
- Website: rna.tbi.univie.ac.at/AREsite

AREsite is a database of AU-rich elements (ARE) in vertebrate mRNA 3'-untranslated regions (UTRs). AU-rich elements are involved in the control of gene expression. They are the most common determinant of RNA stability in mammalian cells. The most recent version of AREsite is called AREsite 2. It represents an update that allows for more detailed analysis of ARE, GRE, and URE (AU, GU, and U-rich elements).

== See also ==
- AU-rich elements
