= KDM5A =

Protein-coding gene in the species Homo sapiens

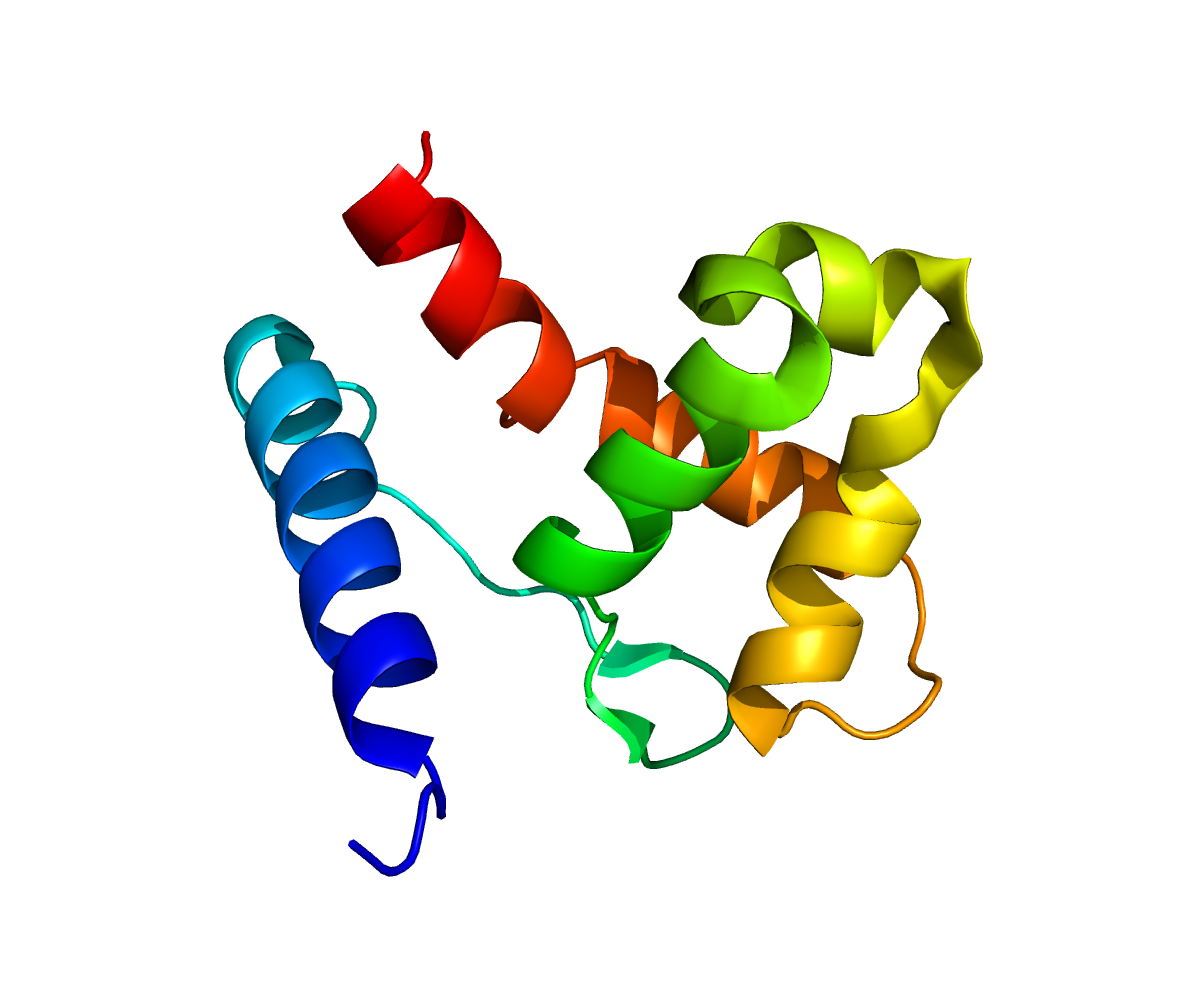

Identifiers
- Aliases: KDM5A, RBBP-2, RBBP2, RBP2, JARID1A, lysine demethylase 5A
- External IDs: OMIM: 180202; MGI: 2136980; GeneCards: KDM5A
Available structures
PDB	Ortholog search: PDBe RCSB
PDB	List of PDB id codes 2JXJ, 2KGG, 2KGI, 3GL6, 5C11, 5E6H, 5IWF, 5IVV, 5ISL, 5CEH, 5IVB
Enzyme activity
EC #	BRENDA	ExPASy	KEGG	MetaCyc
1.14.11.67	↗	↗	↗	↗

Gene location (Human)
Chr.	Chromosome 12 (human)
Band	12p13.33	Start	280,057 bp
Band	12p13.33	End	389,320 bp

Gene location (Mouse)
Chr.	Chromosome 6 (mouse)
Band	6 F1|6 56.95 cM	Start	120,341,085 bp
Band	6 F1|6 56.95 cM	End	120,421,535 bp
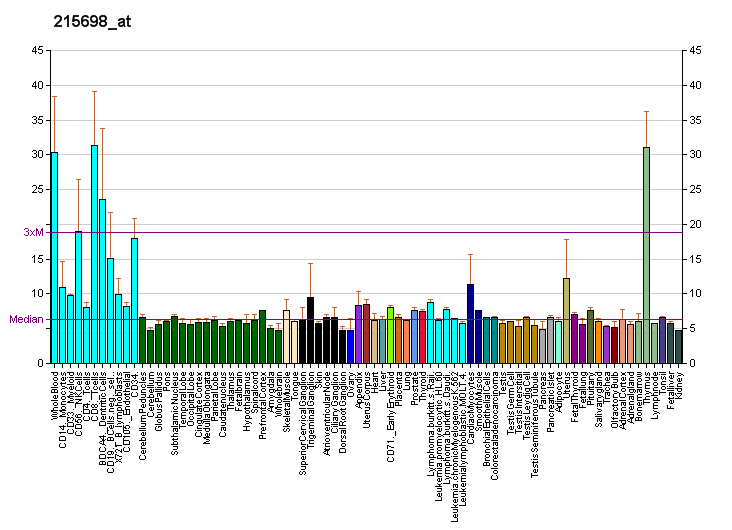

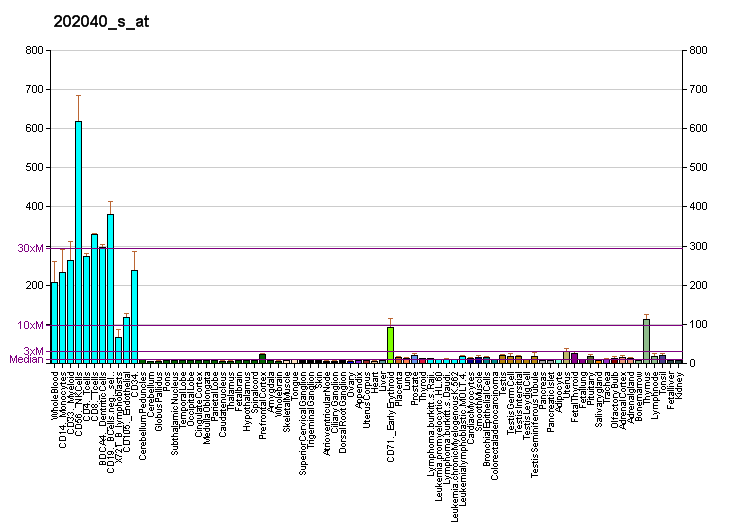
RNA expression pattern
Bgee	Human / Mouse (ortholog); Top expressed in: epithelium of colon; caput epididymis; optic nerve; nipple; tail of epididymis; corpus epididymis; saphenous vein; trabecular bone; pericardium; testicle / Top expressed in: Rostral migratory stream; genital tubercle; Gonadal ridge; medullary collecting duct; pineal gland; tail of embryo; left lung lobe; lobe of cerebellum; internal carotid artery; atrioventricular valve; More reference expression data
BioGPS	More reference expression data
Gene ontology
Molecular function	DNA binding; transcription coactivator activity; chromatin binding; dioxygenase activity; metal ion binding; protein binding; oxidoreductase activity; chromatin DNA binding; histone demethylase activity; core promoter sequence-specific DNA binding; DNA-binding transcription factor activity; histone H3-methyl-lysine-9 demethylase activity; histone H3-tri/di/monomethyl-lysine-4 demethylase activity; zinc ion binding; methylated histone binding; histone binding; DNA-binding transcription factor activity, RNA polymerase II-specific; DNA-binding transcription repressor activity, RNA polymerase II-specific
Cellular component	cyclin-dependent protein kinase activating kinase holoenzyme complex; nucleoplasm; protein-DNA complex; nucleolus; nucleus; histone methyltransferase complex
Biological process	male gonad development; regulation of transcription, DNA-templated; rhythmic process; negative regulation of transcription by RNA polymerase II; transcription by RNA polymerase II; circadian regulation of gene expression; transcription, DNA-templated; positive regulation of transcription, DNA-templated; multicellular organism development; spermatogenesis; negative regulation of histone deacetylase activity; histone H3-K9 demethylation; histone H3-K4 demethylation; histone H3-K4 demethylation, trimethyl-H3-K4-specific; regulation of DNA-binding transcription factor activity; chromatin organization; chromatin remodeling
Sources:Amigo / QuickGO
Orthologs
Databases	NCBI: entry; OMA: entry
Species	Human	Mouse
Entrez	5927	214899
Ensembl	ENSG00000073614	ENSMUSG00000030180
UniProt	P29375	Q3UXZ9
RefSeq (mRNA)	NM_005056; NM_001042603	NM_145997
RefSeq (protein)	NP_001036068	NP_666109
Location (UCSC)	Chr 12: 0.28 – 0.39 Mb	Chr 6: 120.34 – 120.42 Mb
PubMed search
- Wikidata
View/Edit Human	View/Edit Mouse

Lysine-specific demethylase 5A is an enzyme that in humans is encoded by the KDM5A gene.

== Function ==
The protein encoded by this gene is a ubiquitously expressed nuclear protein. It binds directly, with several other proteins, to retinoblastoma protein which regulates cell proliferation. It was formerly known as Retinoblastoma Binding Protein 2 (RBP2). This protein also interacts with rhombotin-2 which functions distinctly in erythropoiesis and in T-cell leukemogenesis. Rhombotin-2 is thought to either directly affect the activity of the encoded protein or may indirectly modulate the functions of the retinoblastoma protein by binding to this protein. Alternatively spliced transcript variants encoding distinct isoforms have been found for this gene.

The Drosophila homolog, LID, was found to be an H3K4 histone demethylase that binds to c-Myc. It was recently renamed to Lysine Demethylase 5 (KDM5).

Enzymatically can be designated as a trimethyllysine dioxygenase, which is a member of the alpha-ketoglutarate-dependent hydroxylase superfamily (EC 1.14.11.8).

== Interactions ==
JARID1A has been shown to interact with Estrogen receptor alpha, LMO2 and Retinoblastoma protein.

JARID1A is a major component of the circadian clock, the upregulation of which at the end of the sleep phase blocks HDAC1 activity. Blocking HDAC1 activity results in an upregulation of CLOCK and BMAL1 and consequent upregulation of PER proteins. The PSF (polypyrimidine tract-binding protein-associated splicing factor) within the PER complex recruits SIN3A, a scaffold for assembly of transcriptional inhibitory complexes and rhythmically delivers histone deacetylases to the Per1 promoter, which repress Per1 transcription.

Knockdown of JARID1A promoted osteogenic differentiation of human adipose-derived stromal cells in vitro and in vivo and resulted in marked increases of mRNA expression of osteogenesis-associated genes such as alkaline phosphatase (ALP), osteocalcin (OC), and osterix (OSX). RBP2 was shown to occupy the promoters of OSX and OC to maintain the level of the H3K4me3 mark by chromatin immunoprecipitation assays. RBP2 was also physically and functionally associated with RUNX2, an essential transcription factor that governed osteoblastic differentiation. RUNX2 knockdown impaired the repressive activity of RBP2 in osteogenic differentiation of human adipose-derived stromal cells.
