= HNRPD =

Protein-coding gene in the species Homo sapiens

HNRNPD
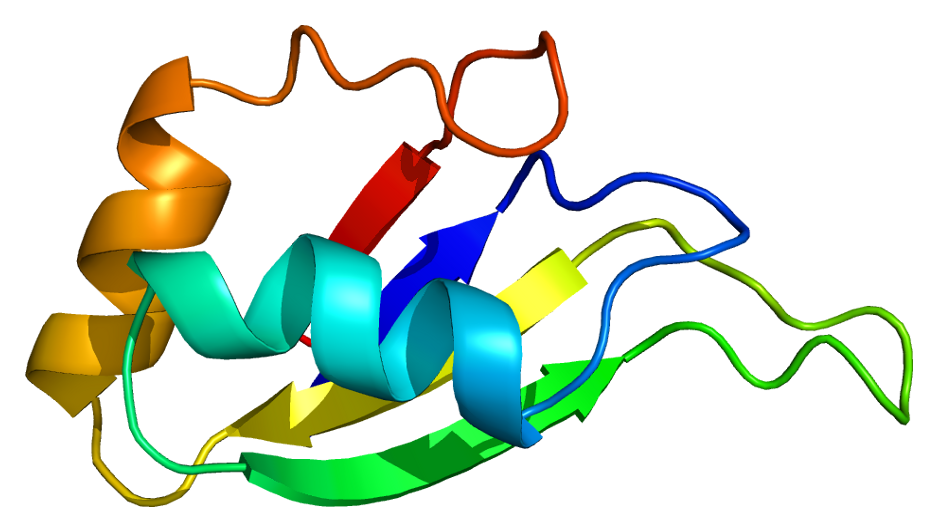

Identifiers
- Aliases: HNRNPD, AUF1, AUF1A, HNRPD, P37, hnRNPD0, heterogeneous nuclear ribonucleoprotein D
- External IDs: OMIM: 601324; MGI: 101947; GeneCards: HNRNPD
Available structures
PDB	Ortholog search: D6RF44 PDBe D6RF44 RCSB
PDB	List of PDB id codes 1HD0, 1HD1, 1IQT, 1WTB, 1X0F, 2Z5N

Gene location (Human)
Chr.	Chromosome 4 (human)
Band	4q21.22	Start	82,352,498 bp
Band	4q21.22	End	82,374,503 bp

Gene location (Mouse)
Chr.	Chromosome 5 (mouse)
Band	5|5 E4	Start	100,103,794 bp
Band	5|5 E4	End	100,126,797 bp
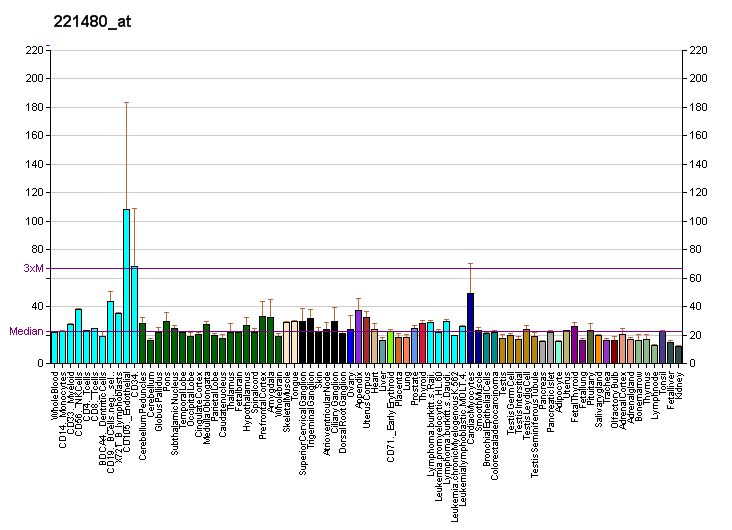

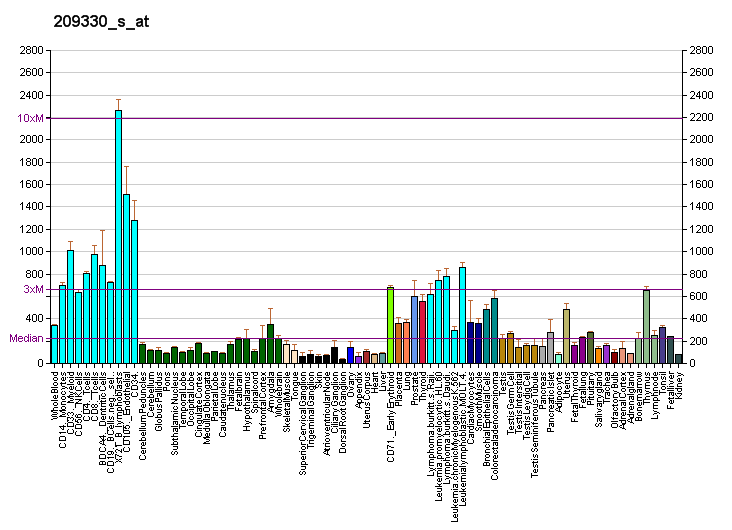

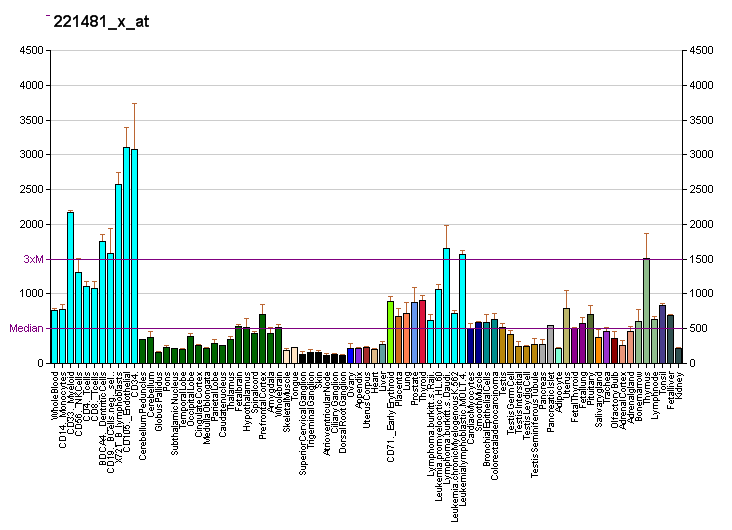
RNA expression pattern
Bgee	Human / Mouse (ortholog); Top expressed in: ganglionic eminence; ventricular zone; epithelium of nasopharynx; tendon of biceps brachii; pylorus; endometrium; gingival epithelium; lactiferous duct; germinal epithelium; tonsil / Top expressed in: tail of embryo; genital tubercle; epiblast; ventricular zone; mandibular prominence; maxillary prominence; neural layer of retina; abdominal wall; ganglionic eminence; somite; More reference expression data
BioGPS	More reference expression data
Gene ontology
Molecular function	telomeric DNA binding; protein binding; minor groove of adenine-thymine-rich DNA binding; mRNA binding; histone deacetylase binding; transcription factor binding; chromatin binding; mRNA 3'-UTR AU-rich region binding; DNA binding; nucleic acid binding; RNA binding; sequence-specific DNA binding; sequence-specific double-stranded DNA binding
Cellular component	cytoplasm; cytosol; extracellular exosome; nucleoplasm; nucleus; synapse; ribonucleoprotein complex
Biological process	response to electrical stimulus; hepatocyte dedifferentiation; cellular response to amino acid stimulus; positive regulation of transcription, DNA-templated; response to estradiol; mRNA stabilization; response to rapamycin; cellular response to putrescine; cerebellum development; negative regulation of gene expression; mRNA splicing, via spliceosome; positive regulation of translation; RNA processing; liver development; transcription, DNA-templated; regulation of circadian rhythm; response to calcium ion; response to sodium phosphate; 3'-UTR-mediated mRNA destabilization; regulation of mRNA stability; cellular response to nitric oxide; rhythmic process; cellular response to estradiol stimulus; brain development; RNA catabolic process; circadian regulation of translation; regulation of transcription, DNA-templated; positive regulation of gene expression; mRNA transcription by RNA polymerase II; positive regulation of telomere capping; positive regulation of telomerase RNA reverse transcriptase activity; regulation of telomere maintenance; RNA metabolic process
Sources:Amigo / QuickGO
Orthologs
Databases	NCBI: entry; OMA: entry
Species	Human	Mouse
Entrez	3184	11991
Ensembl	ENSG00000138668	ENSMUSG00000000568
UniProt	Q14103	Q60668
RefSeq (mRNA)	NM_031370; NM_001003810; NM_002138; NM_031369	NM_001077265; NM_001077266; NM_001077267; NM_007516
RefSeq (protein)	NP_001003810; NP_002129; NP_112737; NP_112738	NP_001070733; NP_001070734; NP_001070735; NP_031542
Location (UCSC)	Chr 4: 82.35 – 82.37 Mb	Chr 5: 100.1 – 100.13 Mb
PubMed search
- Wikidata
View/Edit Human	View/Edit Mouse

Heterogeneous nuclear ribonucleoprotein D0 (HNRNPD) also known as AU-rich element RNA-binding protein 1 (AUF1) is a protein that in humans is encoded by the HNRNPD gene. Alternative splicing of this gene results in four transcript variants.

== Function ==
A consensus secondary structure and primary sequence for the targets of the AUF1 RNA binding protein.

This gene belongs to the subfamily of ubiquitously expressed heterogeneous nuclear ribonucleoproteins (hnRNPs). The hnRNPs are nucleic acid binding proteins and they complex with heterogeneous nuclear RNA (hnRNA). The interaction sites on the RNA are frequently biased towards particular sequence motifs. These proteins are associated with pre-mRNAs in the nucleus and appear to influence pre-mRNA processing and other aspects of mRNA metabolism and transport. While all of the hnRNPs are present in the nucleus, some seem to shuttle between the nucleus and the cytoplasm. The hnRNP proteins have distinct nucleic acid binding properties. The protein encoded by this gene has two repeats of quasi-RRM domains that bind to RNAs. It localizes to both the nucleus and the cytoplasm. This protein is implicated in the regulation of mRNA stability.

== Interactions ==
HnRNP D has been shown to interact with SAFB and Hsp27. It also has been reported to interact with mRNAs such as Mef2c mRNA.
