= Propylpyrazoletriol =

Chemical compound

Identifiers
- IUPAC name: 4-[2,3-bis(4-hydroxyphenyl)-4-propyl-1H-pyrazol-5-ylidene]cyclohexa-2,5-dien-1-one
- CAS Number: 263717-53-9
- PubChem CID: 6095481
- ChemSpider: 16142497
- UNII: 0T83Y6JZPF
- CompTox Dashboard (EPA): DTXSID9040392

Chemical and physical data
- Formula: C_{24}H_{22}N_{2}O_{3}
- Molar mass: 386.451 g·mol^{−1}
- 3D model (JSmol): Interactive image
- SMILES: CCCC1=C(N(NC1=C2C=CC(=O)C=C2)C3=CC=C(C=C3)O)C4=CC=C(C=C4)O
- InChI: InChI=1S/C24H22N2O3/c1-2-3-22-23(16-4-10-19(27)11-5-16)25-26(18-8-14-21(29)15-9-18)24(22)17-6-12-20(28)13-7-17/h4-15,25,28-29H,2-3H2,1H3; Key:UOSWGERPQQOSHS-UHFFFAOYSA-N

Propylpyrazoletriol (PPT) is a synthetic, nonsteroidal agonist of ERα with 400-fold selectivity over ERβ that is used widely in scientific research to study the function of ERα. Though originally thought to be highly selective for ERα, PPT has subsequently been found to also act as an agonist of the GPER (GPR30).

== See also ==
- ERA-45
- ERA-63
- GTx-758
- Methylpiperidinopyrazole (MPP)
