= GREB1 =

Protein-coding gene in the species Homo sapiens

Identifiers
- Aliases: GREB1, growth regulation by estrogen in breast cancer 1, growth regulating estrogen receptor binding 1
- External IDs: OMIM: 611736; MGI: 2149712; HomoloGene: 8780; GeneCards: GREB1; OMA:GREB1 - orthologs

Gene location (Human)
Chr.	Chromosome 2 (human)
Band	2p25.1	Start	11,482,341 bp
Band	2p25.1	End	11,642,788 bp

Gene location (Mouse)
Chr.	Chromosome 12 (mouse)
Band	12|12 A1.1	Start	16,720,616 bp
Band	12|12 A1.1	End	16,850,887 bp
RNA expression pattern
Bgee	Human / Mouse (ortholog); Top expressed in: left ovary; right ovary; germinal epithelium; canal of the cervix; left uterine tube; myometrium; body of uterus; right uterine tube; prostate; ectocervix / Top expressed in: tail of embryo; cumulus cell; lumbar spinal ganglion; efferent ductule; primitive streak; otic vesicle; adrenal gland; substantia nigra; Paneth cell; ovary; More reference expression data
BioGPS	n/a
Orthologs
Species	Human	Mouse
Entrez	9687	268527
Ensembl	ENSG00000196208	ENSMUSG00000036523
UniProt	Q4ZG55	Q3UHK3
RefSeq (mRNA)	NM_014668; NM_033090; NM_148903	NM_001252071; NM_015764
RefSeq (protein)	NP_055483; NP_149081; NP_683701	NP_001239000; NP_056579
Location (UCSC)	Chr 2: 11.48 – 11.64 Mb	Chr 12: 16.72 – 16.85 Mb
PubMed search
- Wikidata
View/Edit Human	View/Edit Mouse

Growth regulation by estrogen in breast cancer 1 is a protein that in humans is encoded by the GREB1 gene.

== Function ==
This gene is an estrogen-responsive gene that is an early response gene in the estrogen receptor-regulated pathway. It is thought to play an important role in hormone-responsive tissues and cancer. Three alternatively spliced transcript variants encoding distinct isoforms have been found for this gene.
