= ERA-63 =

Chemical compound

Clinical data
- Other names: 3-Methylene-7α-methylethinylestradiol; 3-Methylene-7α-methyl-17α-ethynylestra-5(10)-en-17β-ol

Identifiers
- IUPAC name: (7R,8R,9S,13S,14S,17R)-17-Ethynyl-7,13-dimethyl-3-methylidene-1,2,4,6,7,8,9,11,12,14,15,16-dodecahydrocyclopenta[a]phenanthren-17-ol
- CAS Number: 343248-86-2
- PubChem CID: 87921126
- ChemSpider: 8058857

Chemical and physical data
- Formula: C_{22}H_{30}O
- Molar mass: 310.481 g·mol^{−1}
- 3D model (JSmol): Interactive image
- SMILES: C[C@@H]1CC2=C(CCC(=C)C2)[C@@H]3[C@@H]1[C@@H]4CC[C@]([C@]4(CC3)C)(C#C)O
- InChI: InChI=1S/C22H30O/c1-5-22(23)11-9-19-20-15(3)13-16-12-14(2)6-7-17(16)18(20)8-10-21(19,22)4/h1,15,18-20,23H,2,6-13H2,3-4H3/t15-,18-,19+,20-,21+,22+/m1/s1; Key:ITYURVXIFIQGDB-LADQHVHVSA-N

ERA-63, also known as ORG-37663, as well as 3-methylene-7α-methyl-17α-ethynylestra-5(10)-en-17β-ol, is a synthetic, steroidal estrogen and a selective agonist of the ERα that was under development for the treatment of rheumatoid arthritis but was never marketed. The drug produced estrogenic effects but failed to show effectiveness for rheumatoid arthritis in a phase IIa clinical study. A large clinical trial also found that prinaberel (ERB-041), a selective ERβ agonist, was ineffective in the treatment of rheumatoid arthritis in spite of activity in preclinical models.

== See also ==
- 16α-LE2
- ERA-45
- GTx-758
- Methylpiperidinopyrazole
- Propylpyrazoletriol
