= Estrogen receptor alpha =

Protein-coding gene in the species Homo sapiens

ESR1
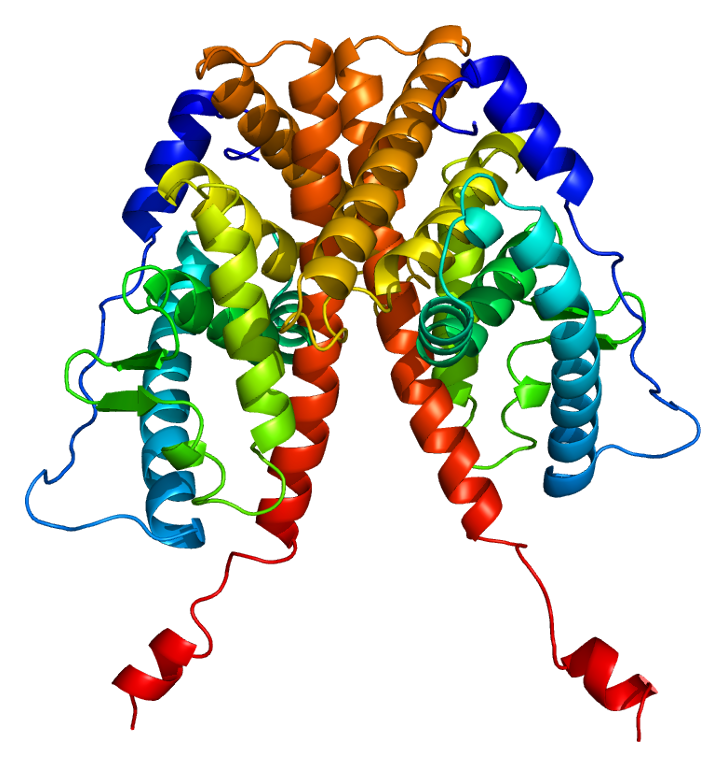

Identifiers
- Aliases: ESR1, ER, ESR, ESRA, ESTRR, Era, NR3A1, estrogen receptor 1
- External IDs: OMIM: 133430; MGI: 1352467; GeneCards: ESR1
Available structures
PDB	Ortholog search: PDBe RCSB
PDB	List of PDB id codes 1A52, 1ERE, 1ERR, 1G50, 1GWQ, 1GWR, 1HCP, 1HCQ, 1L2I, 1PCG, 1QKT, 1QKU, 1R5K, 1SJ0, 1UOM, 1X7E, 1X7R, 1XP1, 1XP6, 1XP9, 1XPC, 1XQC, 1YIM, 1YIN, 1ZKY, 2AYR, 2B1V, 2B1Z, 2B23, 2BJ4, 2FAI, 2G44, 2G5O, 2I0J, 2IOG, 2IOK, 2JF9, 2JFA, 2LLO, 2LLQ, 2OCF, 2OUZ, 2P15, 2POG, 2Q6J, 2Q70, 2QA6, 2QA8, 2QAB, 2QE4, 2QGT, 2QGW, 2QH6, 2QR9, 2QSE, 2QXM, 2QXS, 2QZO, 2R6W, 2R6Y, 2YAT, 2YJA, 3CBM, 3CBO, 3CBP, 3DT3, 3ERD, 3ERT, 3HLV, 3HM1, 3L03, 3OS8, 3OS9, 3OSA, 3Q95, 3Q97, 3UU7, 3UUA, 3UUC, 3UUD, 4AA6, 4DMA, 4IU7, 4IUI, 4IV2, 4IV4, 4IVW, 4IVY, 4IW6, 4IW8, 4IWC, 4IWF, 4JC3, 4JDD, 4MG5, 4MG6, 4MG7, 4MG8, 4MG9, 4MGA, 4MGB, 4MGC, 4MGD, 4O6F, 4PP6, 4PPP, 4PPS, 4PXM, 4Q13, 4Q50, 4TUZ, 4TV1, 5AK2, 5AAV, 5ACC, 5AAU, 4XI3, 4ZN9, 5FQS, 5FQR, 5FQP, 5FQT, 5FQV, 4ZN7, 5E0W, 5DUG, 4ZUC, 5DXK, 5E19, 5DXQ, 5EI1, 5DXR, 5DVS, 5DZ1, 5E0X, 5DKB, 5DWI, 5E14, 5DXB, 5BPR, 5EIT, 5E15, 4ZNS, 5EGV, 5DL4, 5DWE, 4ZNT, 5EHJ, 5DYD, 5DWG, 4ZNV, 5DWJ, 5DID, 4ZUB, 5BNU, 5DMC, 5DK9, 5DIG, 5DUH, 5DKS, 5DMF, 5DU5, 5DY8, 4ZWH, 5DVV, 5DLR, 4ZWK, 5DRM, 5DP0, 5DKE, 5DZI, 5DZ3, 4ZNU, 5DIE, 5DZ0, 5E1C, 5HYR, 5BQ4, 4ZNW, 5DUE, 5DTV, 5DRJ, 5DKG, 4ZNH, 5BP6, 5DXG, 5DI7, 5DX3, 5DYB, 5DXP, 5DZH, 5DXM

Gene location (Human)
Chr.	Chromosome 6 (human)
Band	6q25.1-q25.2	Start	151,656,691 bp
Band	6q25.1-q25.2	End	152,129,619 bp

Gene location (Mouse)
Chr.	Chromosome 10 (mouse)
Band	10 A1|10 2.03 cM	Start	4,561,593 bp
Band	10 A1|10 2.03 cM	End	4,955,614 bp
RNA expression pattern
Bgee	Human / Mouse (ortholog); Top expressed in: cervix epithelium; vulva; endometrium; canal of the cervix; right uterine tube; ectocervix; epithelium of lactiferous gland; lactiferous duct; body of uterus; vagina / Top expressed in: gastrula; vas deferens; efferent ductule; uterus; decidua; intercostal muscle; triceps brachii muscle; sternocleidomastoid muscle; lumbar spinal ganglion; temporal muscle; More reference expression data
BioGPS	n/a
Gene ontology
Molecular function	DNA-binding transcription factor activity; DNA-binding transcription activator activity, RNA polymerase II-specific; nitric-oxide synthase regulator activity; nuclear receptor activity; estrogen response element binding; transcription factor binding; metal ion binding; RNA polymerase II cis-regulatory region sequence-specific DNA binding; steroid hormone receptor activity; steroid binding; beta-catenin binding; zinc ion binding; chromatin binding; protein binding; DNA binding; sequence-specific DNA binding; ATPase binding; identical protein binding; lipid binding; core promoter sequence-specific DNA binding; enzyme binding; protein kinase binding; TFIIB-class transcription factor binding; TBP-class protein binding; estrogen receptor activity; estrogen receptor binding; transcription coactivator binding; phosphatidylinositol-4,5-bisphosphate 3-kinase activity; DNA-binding transcription factor activity, RNA polymerase II-specific
Cellular component	cytoplasm; membrane; nucleus; integral component of membrane; Golgi apparatus; plasma membrane; nucleoplasm; transcription preinitiation complex; cytosol; protein-containing complex
Biological process	epithelial cell development; positive regulation of phospholipase C activity; mammary gland alveolus development; transcription by RNA polymerase II; phospholipase C-activating G protein-coupled receptor signaling pathway; epithelial cell proliferation involved in mammary gland duct elongation; prostate epithelial cord arborization involved in prostate glandular acinus morphogenesis; protein localization to chromatin; steroid hormone mediated signaling pathway; regulation of apoptotic process; chromatin remodeling; regulation of transcription, DNA-templated; androgen metabolic process; positive regulation of fibroblast proliferation; mammary gland branching involved in pregnancy; negative regulation of gene expression; transcription, DNA-templated; negative regulation of DNA-binding transcription factor activity; cellular response to estrogen stimulus; positive regulation of transcription, DNA-templated; positive regulation of nitric-oxide synthase activity; transcription initiation from RNA polymerase II promoter; regulation of branching involved in prostate gland morphogenesis; male gonad development; positive regulation of DNA-binding transcription factor activity; negative regulation of transcription by RNA polymerase II; negative regulation of I-kappaB kinase/NF-kappaB signaling; negative regulation of production of miRNAs involved in gene silencing by miRNA; response to estrogen; uterus development; prostate epithelial cord elongation; antral ovarian follicle growth; vagina development; positive regulation of cytosolic calcium ion concentration; positive regulation of nitric oxide biosynthetic process; signal transduction; positive regulation of transcription by RNA polymerase II; intracellular steroid hormone receptor signaling pathway; regulation of inflammatory response; response to estradiol; regulation of toll-like receptor signaling pathway; regulation of transcription by RNA polymerase II; protein deubiquitination; cellular response to estradiol stimulus; intracellular estrogen receptor signaling pathway; positive regulation of RNA polymerase II transcription preinitiation complex assembly; stem cell differentiation; regulation of Wnt signaling pathway; regulation of intracellular estrogen receptor signaling pathway; phosphatidylinositol phosphate biosynthetic process; positive regulation of protein kinase B signaling
Sources:Amigo / QuickGO
Orthologs
Databases	NCBI: entry; OMA: entry
Species	Human	Mouse
Entrez	2099	13982
Ensembl	ENSG00000091831	ENSMUSG00000019768
UniProt	P03372	P19785
RefSeq (mRNA)	NM_000125; NM_001122740; NM_001122741; NM_001122742; NM_001291230 NM_001291241; NM_001328100; NM_001385568; NM_001385569; NM_001385570; NM_001385571; NM_001385572	NM_007956; NM_001302531; NM_001302532; NM_001302533
RefSeq (protein)	NP_000116; NP_001116212; NP_001116213; NP_001116214; NP_001278159 NP_001278170; NP_001315029	NP_001289460; NP_001289461; NP_001289462; NP_031982
Location (UCSC)	Chr 6: 151.66 – 152.13 Mb	Chr 10: 4.56 – 4.96 Mb
PubMed search
- Wikidata
View/Edit Human	View/Edit Mouse

Estrogen receptor alpha (ERα), also known as NR3A1 (nuclear receptor subfamily 3, group A, member 1), is one of two main types of estrogen receptor, a nuclear receptor (mainly found as a chromatin-binding protein) that is activated by the sex hormone estrogen. In humans, ERα is encoded by the gene ESR1 (EStrogen Receptor 1).

== Structure ==
The estrogen receptor (ER) is a ligand-activated transcription factor composed of several domains important for hormone binding, DNA binding, and activation of transcription. Alternative splicing results in several ESR1 mRNA transcripts, which differ primarily in their 5-prime untranslated regions. The translated receptors show less variability..

Its N-terminal transactivation domain (NTD), which harbors the ligand-independent activation function (AF-1), is intrinsically disordered. Phosphorylation of Ser118 within the NTD triggers a structural expansion that disrupts hydrophobic clustering, promoting receptor activation even in the absence of ligand. Kinases that phosphorylate Ser118 include MAPK (ERK1/2) and CDK7.

== Ligands ==
=== Agonists ===
==== Non-selective ====
- Endogenous estrogens (e.g., estradiol, estrone, estriol, estetrol)
- Natural estrogens (e.g., conjugated equine estrogens)
- Synthetic estrogens (e.g., ethinylestradiol, diethylstilbestrol)

==== Selective ====
Agonists of ERα selective over ERβ include:

- Propylpyrazoletriol (PPT)
- 16α-LE_{2} (Cpd1471)
- 16α-IE_{2}
- ERA-63 (ORG-37663)
- SKF-82,958 – also a D_{1}-like receptor full agonist
- (R,R)-Tetrahydrochrysene ((R,R)-THC) – actually not selective over ERβ, but rather an antagonist instead of an agonist of ERβ

=== Mixed ===
- Phytoestrogens (e.g., coumestrol, daidzein, genistein, miroestrol)
- Selective estrogen receptor modulators (e.g., tamoxifen, clomifene, raloxifene)

=== Antagonists ===
==== Non-selective ====
- Antiestrogens (e.g., fulvestrant, ICI-164384, ethamoxytriphetol)

==== Selective ====
Antagonists of ERα selective over ERβ include:

- Methylpiperidinopyrazole (MPP)

=== Affinities ===
Affinities of estrogen receptor ligands for the ERα and ERβ
Ligand	Other names	Relative binding affinities (RBA, %)^{a}		Absolute binding affinities (K_{i}, nM)^{a}		Action
Ligand	Other names	ERα	ERβ	ERα	ERβ	Action
Estradiol	E2; 17β-Estradiol	100	100	0.115 (0.04–0.24)	0.15 (0.10–2.08)	Estrogen
Estrone	E1; 17-Ketoestradiol	16.39 (0.7–60)	6.5 (1.36–52)	0.445 (0.3–1.01)	1.75 (0.35–9.24)	Estrogen
Estriol	E3; 16α-OH-17β-E2	12.65 (4.03–56)	26 (14.0–44.6)	0.45 (0.35–1.4)	0.7 (0.63–0.7)	Estrogen
Estetrol	E4; 15α,16α-Di-OH-17β-E2	4.0	3.0	4.9	19	Estrogen
Alfatradiol	17α-Estradiol	20.5 (7–80.1)	8.195 (2–42)	0.2–0.52	0.43–1.2	Metabolite
16-Epiestriol	16β-Hydroxy-17β-estradiol	7.795 (4.94–63)	50	?	?	Metabolite
17-Epiestriol	16α-Hydroxy-17α-estradiol	55.45 (29–103)	79–80	?	?	Metabolite
16,17-Epiestriol	16β-Hydroxy-17α-estradiol	1.0	13	?	?	Metabolite
2-Hydroxyestradiol	2-OH-E2	22 (7–81)	11–35	2.5	1.3	Metabolite
2-Methoxyestradiol	2-MeO-E2	0.0027–2.0	1.0	?	?	Metabolite
4-Hydroxyestradiol	4-OH-E2	13 (8–70)	7–56	1.0	1.9	Metabolite
4-Methoxyestradiol	4-MeO-E2	2.0	1.0	?	?	Metabolite
2-Hydroxyestrone	2-OH-E1	2.0–4.0	0.2–0.4	?	?	Metabolite
2-Methoxyestrone	2-MeO-E1	<0.001–<1	<1	?	?	Metabolite
4-Hydroxyestrone	4-OH-E1	1.0–2.0	1.0	?	?	Metabolite
4-Methoxyestrone	4-MeO-E1	<1	<1	?	?	Metabolite
16α-Hydroxyestrone	16α-OH-E1; 17-Ketoestriol	2.0–6.5	35	?	?	Metabolite
2-Hydroxyestriol	2-OH-E3	2.0	1.0	?	?	Metabolite
4-Methoxyestriol	4-MeO-E3	1.0	1.0	?	?	Metabolite
Estradiol sulfate	E2S; Estradiol 3-sulfate	<1	<1	?	?	Metabolite
Estradiol disulfate	Estradiol 3,17β-disulfate	0.0004	?	?	?	Metabolite
Estradiol 3-glucuronide	E2-3G	0.0079	?	?	?	Metabolite
Estradiol 17β-glucuronide	E2-17G	0.0015	?	?	?	Metabolite
Estradiol 3-gluc. 17β-sulfate	E2-3G-17S	0.0001	?	?	?	Metabolite
Estrone sulfate	E1S; Estrone 3-sulfate	<1	<1	>10	>10	Metabolite
Estradiol benzoate	EB; Estradiol 3-benzoate	10	?	?	?	Estrogen
Estradiol 17β-benzoate	E2-17B	11.3	32.6	?	?	Estrogen
Estrone methyl ether	Estrone 3-methyl ether	0.145	?	?	?	Estrogen
ent-Estradiol	1-Estradiol	1.31–12.34	9.44–80.07	?	?	Estrogen
Equilin	7-Dehydroestrone	13 (4.0–28.9)	13.0–49	0.79	0.36	Estrogen
Equilenin	6,8-Didehydroestrone	2.0–15	7.0–20	0.64	0.62	Estrogen
17β-Dihydroequilin	7-Dehydro-17β-estradiol	7.9–113	7.9–108	0.09	0.17	Estrogen
17α-Dihydroequilin	7-Dehydro-17α-estradiol	18.6 (18–41)	14–32	0.24	0.57	Estrogen
17β-Dihydroequilenin	6,8-Didehydro-17β-estradiol	35–68	90–100	0.15	0.20	Estrogen
17α-Dihydroequilenin	6,8-Didehydro-17α-estradiol	20	49	0.50	0.37	Estrogen
Δ^{8}-Estradiol	8,9-Dehydro-17β-estradiol	68	72	0.15	0.25	Estrogen
Δ^{8}-Estrone	8,9-Dehydroestrone	19	32	0.52	0.57	Estrogen
Ethinylestradiol	EE; 17α-Ethynyl-17β-E2	120.9 (68.8–480)	44.4 (2.0–144)	0.02–0.05	0.29–0.81	Estrogen
Mestranol	EE 3-methyl ether	?	2.5	?	?	Estrogen
Moxestrol	RU-2858; 11β-Methoxy-EE	35–43	5–20	0.5	2.6	Estrogen
Methylestradiol	17α-Methyl-17β-estradiol	70	44	?	?	Estrogen
Diethylstilbestrol	DES; Stilbestrol	129.5 (89.1–468)	219.63 (61.2–295)	0.04	0.05	Estrogen
Hexestrol	Dihydrodiethylstilbestrol	153.6 (31–302)	60–234	0.06	0.06	Estrogen
Dienestrol	Dehydrostilbestrol	37 (20.4–223)	56–404	0.05	0.03	Estrogen
Benzestrol (B2)	–	114	?	?	?	Estrogen
Chlorotrianisene	TACE	1.74	?	15.30	?	Estrogen
Triphenylethylene	TPE	0.074	?	?	?	Estrogen
Triphenylbromoethylene	TPBE	2.69	?	?	?	Estrogen
Tamoxifen	ICI-46,474	3 (0.1–47)	3.33 (0.28–6)	3.4–9.69	2.5	SERM
Afimoxifene	4-Hydroxytamoxifen; 4-OHT	100.1 (1.7–257)	10 (0.98–339)	2.3 (0.1–3.61)	0.04–4.8	SERM
Toremifene	4-Chlorotamoxifen; 4-CT	?	?	7.14–20.3	15.4	SERM
Clomifene	MRL-41	25 (19.2–37.2)	12	0.9	1.2	SERM
Cyclofenil	F-6066; Sexovid	151–152	243	?	?	SERM
Nafoxidine	U-11,000A	30.9–44	16	0.3	0.8	SERM
Raloxifene	–	41.2 (7.8–69)	5.34 (0.54–16)	0.188–0.52	20.2	SERM
Arzoxifene	LY-353,381	?	?	0.179	?	SERM
Lasofoxifene	CP-336,156	10.2–166	19.0	0.229	?	SERM
Ormeloxifene	Centchroman	?	?	0.313	?	SERM
Levormeloxifene	6720-CDRI; NNC-460,020	1.55	1.88	?	?	SERM
Ospemifene	Deaminohydroxytoremifene	0.82–2.63	0.59–1.22	?	?	SERM
Bazedoxifene	–	?	?	0.053	?	SERM
Etacstil	GW-5638	4.30	11.5	?	?	SERM
ICI-164,384	–	63.5 (3.70–97.7)	166	0.2	0.08	Antiestrogen
Fulvestrant	ICI-182,780	43.5 (9.4–325)	21.65 (2.05–40.5)	0.42	1.3	Antiestrogen
Propylpyrazoletriol	PPT	49 (10.0–89.1)	0.12	0.40	92.8	ERα agonist
16α-LE2	16α-Lactone-17β-estradiol	14.6–57	0.089	0.27	131	ERα agonist
16α-Iodo-E2	16α-Iodo-17β-estradiol	30.2	2.30	?	?	ERα agonist
Methylpiperidinopyrazole	MPP	11	0.05	?	?	ERα antagonist
Diarylpropionitrile	DPN	0.12–0.25	6.6–18	32.4	1.7	ERβ agonist
8β-VE2	8β-Vinyl-17β-estradiol	0.35	22.0–83	12.9	0.50	ERβ agonist
Prinaberel	ERB-041; WAY-202,041	0.27	67–72	?	?	ERβ agonist
ERB-196	WAY-202,196	?	180	?	?	ERβ agonist
Erteberel	SERBA-1; LY-500,307	?	?	2.68	0.19	ERβ agonist
SERBA-2	–	?	?	14.5	1.54	ERβ agonist
Coumestrol	–	9.225 (0.0117–94)	64.125 (0.41–185)	0.14–80.0	0.07–27.0	Xenoestrogen
Genistein	–	0.445 (0.0012–16)	33.42 (0.86–87)	2.6–126	0.3–12.8	Xenoestrogen
Equol	–	0.2–0.287	0.85 (0.10–2.85)	?	?	Xenoestrogen
Daidzein	–	0.07 (0.0018–9.3)	0.7865 (0.04–17.1)	2.0	85.3	Xenoestrogen
Biochanin A	–	0.04 (0.022–0.15)	0.6225 (0.010–1.2)	174	8.9	Xenoestrogen
Kaempferol	–	0.07 (0.029–0.10)	2.2 (0.002–3.00)	?	?	Xenoestrogen
Naringenin	–	0.0054 (<0.001–0.01)	0.15 (0.11–0.33)	?	?	Xenoestrogen
8-Prenylnaringenin	8-PN	4.4	?	?	?	Xenoestrogen
Quercetin	–	<0.001–0.01	0.002–0.040	?	?	Xenoestrogen
Ipriflavone	–	<0.01	<0.01	?	?	Xenoestrogen
Miroestrol	–	0.39	?	?	?	Xenoestrogen
Deoxymiroestrol	–	2.0	?	?	?	Xenoestrogen
β-Sitosterol	–	<0.001–0.0875	<0.001–0.016	?	?	Xenoestrogen
Resveratrol	–	<0.001–0.0032	?	?	?	Xenoestrogen
α-Zearalenol	–	48 (13–52.5)	?	?	?	Xenoestrogen
β-Zearalenol	–	0.6 (0.032–13)	?	?	?	Xenoestrogen
Zeranol	α-Zearalanol	48–111	?	?	?	Xenoestrogen
Taleranol	β-Zearalanol	16 (13–17.8)	14	0.8	0.9	Xenoestrogen
Zearalenone	ZEN	7.68 (2.04–28)	9.45 (2.43–31.5)	?	?	Xenoestrogen
Zearalanone	ZAN	0.51	?	?	?	Xenoestrogen
Bisphenol A	BPA	0.0315 (0.008–1.0)	0.135 (0.002–4.23)	195	35	Xenoestrogen
Endosulfan	EDS	<0.001–<0.01	<0.01	?	?	Xenoestrogen
Kepone	Chlordecone	0.0069–0.2	?	?	?	Xenoestrogen
o,p'-DDT	–	0.0073–0.4	?	?	?	Xenoestrogen
p,p'-DDT	–	0.03	?	?	?	Xenoestrogen
Methoxychlor	p,p'-Dimethoxy-DDT	0.01 (<0.001–0.02)	0.01–0.13	?	?	Xenoestrogen
HPTE	Hydroxychlor; p,p'-OH-DDT	1.2–1.7	?	?	?	Xenoestrogen
Testosterone	T; 4-Androstenolone	<0.0001–<0.01	<0.002–0.040	>5000	>5000	Androgen
Dihydrotestosterone	DHT; 5α-Androstanolone	0.01 (<0.001–0.05)	0.0059–0.17	221–>5000	73–1688	Androgen
Nandrolone	19-Nortestosterone; 19-NT	0.01	0.23	765	53	Androgen
Dehydroepiandrosterone	DHEA; Prasterone	0.038 (<0.001–0.04)	0.019–0.07	245–1053	163–515	Androgen
5-Androstenediol	A5; Androstenediol	6	17	3.6	0.9	Androgen
4-Androstenediol	–	0.5	0.6	23	19	Androgen
4-Androstenedione	A4; Androstenedione	<0.01	<0.01	>10000	>10000	Androgen
3α-Androstanediol	3α-Adiol	0.07	0.3	260	48	Androgen
3β-Androstanediol	3β-Adiol	3	7	6	2	Androgen
Androstanedione	5α-Androstanedione	<0.01	<0.01	>10000	>10000	Androgen
Etiocholanedione	5β-Androstanedione	<0.01	<0.01	>10000	>10000	Androgen
Methyltestosterone	17α-Methyltestosterone	<0.0001	?	?	?	Androgen
Ethinyl-3α-androstanediol	17α-Ethynyl-3α-adiol	4.0	<0.07	?	?	Estrogen
Ethinyl-3β-androstanediol	17α-Ethynyl-3β-adiol	50	5.6	?	?	Estrogen
Progesterone	P4; 4-Pregnenedione	<0.001–0.6	<0.001–0.010	?	?	Progestogen
Norethisterone	NET; 17α-Ethynyl-19-NT	0.085 (0.0015–<0.1)	0.1 (0.01–0.3)	152	1084	Progestogen
Norethynodrel	5(10)-Norethisterone	0.5 (0.3–0.7)	<0.1–0.22	14	53	Progestogen
Tibolone	7α-Methylnorethynodrel	0.5 (0.45–2.0)	0.2–0.076	?	?	Progestogen
Δ^{4}-Tibolone	7α-Methylnorethisterone	0.069–<0.1	0.027–<0.1	?	?	Progestogen
3α-Hydroxytibolone	–	2.5 (1.06–5.0)	0.6–0.8	?	?	Progestogen
3β-Hydroxytibolone	–	1.6 (0.75–1.9)	0.070–0.1	?	?	Progestogen
Footnotes: ^{a} = (1) Binding affinity values are of the format "median (range)" (# (#–#)), "range" (#–#), or "value" (#) depending on the values available. The full sets of values within the ranges can be found in the Wiki code. (2) Binding affinities were determined via displacement studies in a variety of in-vitro systems with labeled estradiol and human ERα and ERβ proteins (except the ERβ values from Kuiper et al. (1997), which are rat ERβ). Sources: See template page.

== Tissue distribution and function ==
ERα plays a role in the physiological development and function of a variety of organ systems to varying degrees, including the reproductive, central nervous, skeletal, and cardiovascular systems. Accordingly, ERα is widely expressed throughout the body, including the uterus and ovary, male reproductive organs, mammary gland, bone, heart, hypothalamus, pituitary gland, liver, lung, kidney, spleen, and adipose tissue. The development and function of these tissues is disrupted in animal models lacking active ERα genes, such as the ERα knockout mouse (ERKO), providing a preliminary understanding of ERα function at specific target organs.

=== Uterus and ovary ===
ERα is essential in the maturation of the female reproductive phenotype. In the absence of ERα, the ERKO mouse develops an adult uterus, indicating that ERα may not mediate the initial growth of the uterus. However, ERα plays a role in the completion of this development, and the subsequent function of the tissue. Activation of ERα is known to trigger cell proliferation in the uterus. The uterus of female ERKO mice is hypoplastic, suggesting that ERα mediates mitosis and differentiation in the uterus in response to estrogen stimulation.

Similarly, prepubertal female ERKO mice develop ovaries that are nearly indistinguishable from those of their wildtype counterparts. However, as the ERKO mice mature they progressively present an abnormal ovarian phenotype in both physiology and function. Specifically, female ERKO mice develop enlarged ovaries containing hemorrhagic follicular cysts, which also lack the corpus luteum, and therefore do not ovulate. This adult ovarian phenotype suggests that in the absence of ERα, estrogen is no longer able to perform negative feedback on the hypothalamus, resulting in chronically elevated LH levels and constant ovarian stimulation. These results identify a pivotal role for ERα in the hypothalamus, in addition to its role in the estrogen-driven maturation through theca and interstitial cells of the ovary.

=== Male reproductive organs ===
ERα is similarly essential in the maturation and maintenance of the male reproductive phenotype, as male ERKO mice are infertile and present undersized testes. The integrity of testicular structures of ERKO mice, such as the seminiferous tubules of the testes and the seminiferous epithelium, declines over time. Furthermore, the reproductive performance of male ERKO mice is hindered by abnormalities in sexual physiology and behavior, such as impaired spermatogenesis and loss of intromission and ejaculatory responses.

=== Mammary gland ===
Estrogen stimulation of ERα is known to stimulate cell proliferation in breast tissue. ERα is thought to be responsible for pubertal development of the adult phenotype, through mediation of mammary gland response to estrogens. This role is consistent with the abnormalities of female ERKO mice: the epithelial ducts of female ERKO mice fail to grow beyond their pre-pubertal length, and lactational structures do not develop. As a result, the functions of the mammary gland—including both lactation and release of prolactin—are greatly impaired in ERKO mice.

=== Bone ===
Though its expression in bone is moderate, ERα is known to be responsible for maintenance of bone integrity. It is hypothesized that estrogen stimulation of ERα may trigger the release of growth factors, such as epidermal growth factor or insulin-like growth factor-1, which in turn regulate bone development and maintenance. Accordingly, male and female ERKO mice exhibit decreased bone length and size.

=== Brain ===
Estrogen signaling through ERα appears to be responsible for various aspects of central nervous development, such as synaptogenesis and synaptic remodeling. In the brain, ERα is found in hypothalamus, and preoptic area, and arcuate nucleus, all three of which have been linked to reproductive behavior, and the masculinization of the mouse brain appears to take place through ERα function. ERα is highly expressed in the hypothalamic nuclei in the ventromedial, paraventricular, lateral, and arcuate areas. In the arcuate nucleus, estrogen signaling via ERα in pro-opiomelanocortin (POMC) neurons is associated with the regulation of food intake. Experimental studies also suggest that in both the arcuate nucleus and ventromedial hypothalamus, ERα plays a role in the control of energy balance, specifically thermogenesis and physical activity. Furthermore, studies in models of psychopathology and neurodegenerative disease states suggest that estrogen receptors mediate the neuroprotective role of estrogen in the brain. Finally, ERα appears to mediate positive feedback effects of estrogen on the brain's secretion of GnRH and LH, by way increasing expression of kisspeptin in neurons of the arcuate nucleus and anteroventral periventricular nucleus. Although classical studies have suggested that negative feedback effects of estrogen also operate through ERα, female mice lacking ERα in kisspeptin-expressing neurons continue to demonstrate a degree of negative feedback response.

== Clinical significance ==
Estrogen insensitivity syndrome is a very rare condition characterized by a defective ERα that is insensitive to estrogens. The clinical presentation of a female was observed to include absence of breast development and other female secondary sexual characteristics at puberty, hypoplastic uterus, primary amenorrhea, enlarged multicystic ovaries and associated lower abdominal pain, mild hyperandrogenism (manifested as cystic acne), and delayed bone maturation as well as an increased rate of bone turnover. The clinical presentation in a male was reported to include lack of epiphyseal closure, tall stature, osteoporosis, and poor sperm viability. Both individuals were completely insensitive to exogenous estrogen treatment, even with high doses.

Genetic polymorphisms in the gene encoding the ERα have been associated with breast cancer in women, gynecomastia in men and dysmenorrhea.

In patients with breast cancer, mutations in the gene encoding ERα (ESR1) have been associated with resistance to endocrine therapy, especially aromatase inhibitors.

== Coactivators ==
Coactivators of ER-α include:

- SRC-1
- AIB1 – amplified in breast 1
- PELP-1 – Proline-, glutamic acid-, leucine-rich protein 1

== Interactions ==
Estrogen receptor alpha has been shown to interact with:

- AKAP13
- AHR
- BRCA1
- CAV1
- CCNC
- CDC25B
- CEBPB
- COBRA1
- COUP-TFI
- CREBBP
- CRSP3
- Cyclin D1
- DNTTIP2
- EP300
- ESR2
- FOXO1
- GREB1
- GTF2H1
- HSPA1A
- HSPA8
- HSP90AA1
- ISL1
- JARID1A
- MVP
- MED1
- MED12
- MED14
- MED16
- MED24
- MED6
- MGMT
- MNAT1
- MTA1
- NCOA6
- NCOA1
- NCOA2
- NCOA3
- NRIP1
- PDLIM1
- POU4F1
- POU4F2
- PRDM2
- PRMT2
- RBM39
- RNF12
- SAFB
- SAFB2
- SHC1
- SHP
- SMARCA4
- SMARCE1
- Src
- TR2
- TR4
- TDG
- TRIM24 and
- XBP1.
