= DDX21 =

Protein-coding gene in the species Homo sapiens

Identifiers
- Aliases: DDX21, GUA, GURDB, RH-II/GU, RH-II/GuA, DEAD-box helicase 21, DExD-box helicase 21
- External IDs: OMIM: 606357; MGI: 1860494; GeneCards: DDX21
Available structures
PDB	Ortholog search: PDBe RCSB
PDB	List of PDB id codes 2M3D
Enzyme activity
EC #	BRENDA	ExPASy	KEGG	MetaCyc
3.6.4.13	↗	↗	↗	↗

Gene location (Human)
Chr.	Chromosome 10 (human)
Band	10q22.1	Start	68,956,135 bp
Band	10q22.1	End	68,985,068 bp

Gene location (Mouse)
Chr.	Chromosome 10 (mouse)
Band	10 B4|10 32.43 cM	Start	62,416,030 bp
Band	10 B4|10 32.43 cM	End	62,438,060 bp
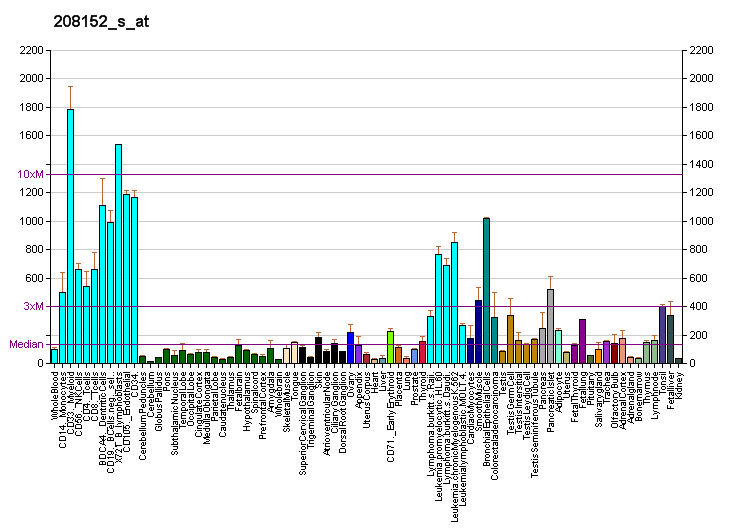
RNA expression pattern
Bgee	Human / Mouse (ortholog); Top expressed in: pericardium; cartilage tissue; mucosa of urinary bladder; mucosa of pharynx; gingival epithelium; vena cava; lower lobe of lung; nipple; lactiferous duct; human penis / Top expressed in: epiblast; cumulus cell; somite; primitive streak; tail of embryo; hair follicle; mandibular prominence; maxillary prominence; abdominal wall; ventricular zone; More reference expression data
BioGPS	More reference expression data
Gene ontology
Molecular function	nucleotide binding; rRNA binding; helicase activity; 7SK snRNA binding; protein binding; nucleic acid binding; double-stranded RNA binding; hydrolase activity; ATP binding; snoRNA binding; RNA binding; miRNA binding; identical protein binding
Cellular component	membrane; nucleoplasm; nucleus; nucleolus; cytoplasm; mitochondrion; cytosol
Biological process	epigenetic maintenance of chromatin in transcription-competent conformation; response to exogenous dsRNA; response to virus; transcription by RNA polymerase II; transcription, DNA-templated; osteoblast differentiation; RNA secondary structure unwinding; rRNA processing; immune system process; positive regulation of myeloid dendritic cell cytokine production; positive regulation of I-kappaB kinase/NF-kappaB signaling; innate immune response; defense response to virus
Sources:Amigo / QuickGO
Orthologs
Databases	NCBI: entry; OMA: entry
Species	Human	Mouse
Entrez	9188	56200
Ensembl	ENSG00000165732	ENSMUSG00000020075
UniProt	Q9NR30	Q9JIK5
RefSeq (mRNA)	NM_001256910; NM_004728	NM_019553
RefSeq (protein)	NP_001243839; NP_004719	NP_062426
Location (UCSC)	Chr 10: 68.96 – 68.99 Mb	Chr 10: 62.42 – 62.44 Mb
PubMed search
- Wikidata
View/Edit Human	View/Edit Mouse

Nucleolar RNA helicase 2 is an enzyme that in humans is encoded by the DDX21 gene.

== Function ==
DEAD box proteins, characterized by the conserved motif Asp-Glu-Ala-Asp (DEAD), are putative RNA helicases. They are implicated in a number of cellular processes involving alteration of RNA secondary structure such as translation initiation, nuclear and mitochondrial splicing, and ribosome and spliceosome assembly. Based on their distribution patterns, some members of this family are believed to be involved in embryogenesis, spermatogenesis, and cellular growth and division. This gene encodes a DEAD box protein, which is an antigen recognized by autoimmune antibodies from a patient with watermelon stomach disease. This protein unwinds double-stranded RNA, folds single-stranded RNA, and may play important roles in ribosomal RNA biogenesis, RNA editing, RNA transport, and general transcription.

== Interactions ==
DDX21 has been shown to interact with C-jun. DDX21 has been reported to bind to AU-rich elements (AREs) and confer mTOR-mediated translation control during T cell activation.
