= RLIM =

Protein-coding gene in the species Homo sapiens

Identifiers
- Aliases: RLIM, NY-REN-43, RNF12, ring finger protein, LIM domain interacting, MRX61, TOKAS
- External IDs: OMIM: 300379; MGI: 1342291; GeneCards: RLIM
Enzyme activity
EC #	BRENDA	ExPASy	KEGG	MetaCyc
2.3.2.27	↗	↗	↗	↗

Gene location (Human)
Chr.	X chromosome (human)
Band	Xq13.2	Start	74,582,976 bp
Band	Xq13.2	End	74,614,624 bp

Gene location (Mouse)
Chr.	X chromosome (mouse)
Band	X 46.42 cM|X D	Start	103,000,769 bp
Band	X 46.42 cM|X D	End	103,024,890 bp
RNA expression pattern
Bgee	Human / Mouse (ortholog); Top expressed in: middle temporal gyrus; cartilage tissue; Achilles tendon; Brodmann area 46; postcentral gyrus; internal globus pallidus; entorhinal cortex; Brodmann area 23; tendon of biceps brachii; pars compacta / Top expressed in: gastrula; cumulus cell; internal carotid artery; zygote; Gonadal ridge; external carotid artery; ectoderm; otic vesicle; Rostral migratory stream; otic placode; More reference expression data
BioGPS	n/a
Gene ontology
Molecular function	transcription corepressor activity; metal ion binding; transferase activity; ubiquitin-protein transferase activity; ubiquitin protein ligase activity; protein binding
Cellular component	transcription repressor complex; nucleus; cytosol; nucleoplasm
Biological process	negative regulation of transcription, DNA-templated; transcription, DNA-templated; protein ubiquitination; proteasome-mediated ubiquitin-dependent protein catabolic process; protein polyubiquitination; regulation of transcription, DNA-templated; negative regulation of transcription by RNA polymerase II; ubiquitin-dependent protein catabolic process; negative regulation of DNA-binding transcription factor activity; random inactivation of X chromosome; regulation of dosage compensation by inactivation of X chromosome
Sources:Amigo / QuickGO
Orthologs
Databases	NCBI: entry; OMA: entry
Species	Human	Mouse
Entrez	51132	19820
Ensembl	ENSG00000131263	ENSMUSG00000056537
UniProt	Q9NVW2	Q9WTV7
RefSeq (mRNA)	NM_183353; NM_016120	NM_011276; NM_001358205
RefSeq (protein)	NP_057204; NP_899196	NP_035406; NP_001345134
Location (UCSC)	Chr X: 74.58 – 74.61 Mb	Chr X: 103 – 103.02 Mb
PubMed search
- Wikidata
View/Edit Human	View/Edit Mouse

E3 ubiquitin-protein ligase RLIM is an enzyme that in humans is encoded by the RLIM gene (previously RNF12).

== Function ==
The protein encoded by this gene is a RING-H2 zinc finger protein. It has been shown to be a ubiquitin protein ligase that targets LIM domain binding 1 (LDB1/CLIM), and causes proteasome-dependent degradation of LDB1. This protein and LDB1 are co-repressors of LHX1/LIM-1, a homeodomain transcription factor. Alternatively spliced transcript variants encoding the same protein have been reported. The protein functions in female mice as a regulator of X chromosome inactivation.

== Interactions ==
The RLIM protein has been shown to interact with Estrogen receptor alpha.
