= BMS-641988 =

Chemical compound

Clinical data
- Routes of administration: By mouth
- Drug class: Nonsteroidal antiandrogen

Identifiers
- IUPAC name: N-[(3aR,4R,5R,7R,7aS)-2-[4-Cyano-3-(trifluoromethyl)phenyl]-4,7-dimethyl-1,3-dioxo-3a,5,6,7a-tetrahydro-octahydro-1H-4,7-epoxyisoindol-5-yl]ethanesulfonamide
- CAS Number: 1093276-09-5 573738-99-5
- PubChem CID: 24768935
- ChemSpider: 32701355
- UNII: W17M53Y8IM
- ChEBI: CHEBI:95017
- ChEMBL: ChEMBL3932464
- CompTox Dashboard (EPA): DTXSID70205969

Chemical and physical data
- Formula: C_{20}H_{20}F_{3}N_{3}O_{5}S
- Molar mass: 471.45 g·mol^{−1}
- 3D model (JSmol): Interactive image
- SMILES: CCS(=O)(=O)N[C@@H]1C[C@@]2([C@@H]3[C@H]([C@]1(O2)C)C(=O)N(C3=O)C4=CC(=C(C=C4)C#N)C(F)(F)F)C
- InChI: InChI=1S/C20H20F3N3O5S/c1-4-32(29,30)25-13-8-18(2)14-15(19(13,3)31-18)17(28)26(16(14)27)11-6-5-10(9-24)12(7-11)20(21,22)23/h5-7,13-15,25H,4,8H2,1-3H3/t13-,14-,15+,18-,19+/m1/s1; Key:HYNANJUKEMCYEQ-HIGHGGLBSA-N

BMS-641988 is a nonsteroidal antiandrogen which was developed by Bristol-Myers Squibb for the treatment of prostate cancer but was never marketed. It acts as a potent competitive antagonist of the androgen receptor (AR) (K_{i} = 10 nM; IC_{50} = 56 nM). The drug was found to have 20-fold higher affinity for the AR than bicalutamide in MDA-MB-453 cells, and showed 3- to 7-fold the antiandrogenic activity of bicalutamide in vitro. It may have some weak partial agonist activity at the androgen receptor. BMS-641988 is transformed by CYP3A4 into BMS-570511, and this metabolite is then reduced to BMS-501949 by cytosolic reductases. All three compounds show similar antiandrogenic activity. In addition to its antiandrogenic activity, BMS-641988 shows activity as a negative allosteric modulator of the GABA_{A} receptor, and can produce seizures in animals at sufficiently high doses. It also shows some drug-induced QT prolongation. BMS-641988 reached phase I clinical trials prior to the discontinuation of its development. The clinical development of BMS-641988 was terminated due to the occurrence of a seizure in a patient during a phase I study.
