= MDA-MB-453 =

Human breast cancer cell line

MDA-MB-453 is a human breast cancer cell line.

== MDA-MB-453 Characteristics ==
MDA-MB-453
Product Category	Human Cells
Organism	Homo sapiens, human
Morphology	epithelial
Tissue	Breast; Mammary gland
Disease	Carcinoma; Metastatic
Applications	3D cell culture, Cancer research
Product Format	Frozen
Storage Conditions	Vapor phase of liquid nitrogen

== History ==
The MDA-MB-453 cell cancer line was derived in 1976 from the pericardial effusion of a 48-year-old female who was suffering from a breast metastatic adenocarcinoma. The respective cells were collected at the Human Tumor Cell Bank.

== Recommended media for growth ==
When growing the MDA-MB-453 cells, the recommended media for growth according to Lonza is a L-15 (Leibovitz). The medium does not have arginine, cysteine, histidine, sodium bicarbonate, carbon dioxide, and glucose. The medium does contain tyrosine and galactose. The L-15 medium was created in 1963 for the rapid growth of the MDA-MB-453 cell line. Also, it is recommended that the cells are treated with Fetal Bovine Serum. Fetal Bovine Serum increases cellular growth and plating efficiency.

== Impacts/prevalence ==
In 2020, there was an estimated total of 684,996 deaths caused by breast cancer. Breast cancer is the fifth leading cause by death, so there is need of research and cell lines to understand how specific cancers work so accurate target therapies can be implemented.

=== Model for breast cancer ===
The cell line is a great model for breast cancer cells because the cells proliferate at a fast rate and is stimulated by androgens, but inhibited by progesterone, estrogen, and Her-2 receptors. The specific mutation that contributes to the cell cancer line is a glutamate to histidine change found on exon 7; more specifically, the amino acid 865. With the specific characteristics, the MDA-MB-453 cell cancer line is now classified as a Triple Negative Breast Cancer cell line model.

One study suggests that the MDA-MB-453 cell line is not the best model for an apocrine breast cancer model. During the experiment, there was a mutation in the K-RAS gene that was not previously identified before. Also, there were structural abnormalities as shown on a Western Blot. Lastly, there were cell signaling differences that were not found in the samples. All of these characteristics are different from an apocrine breast cancer cell, which might lead to the idea that MDA-MB-453 cell line is not the best model. More specific differences between MDA-MB-453 and the apocrine carcinoma tissue sample differ in different features. They differ with the GCDFP-15 protein, HER-2/neu status, EGFR status, KRAS gene status, p16lnk4a protein, cyclin d1 protein, and polysomy 4 and 17. On the other hand, MDA-MB-453 cell line is a great model to understand androgen and the androgen receptor in breast cancer. When the cell line was studied, there was androgen receptor expression and regulation. Androgen and the receptors in breast cancer have not been studied thoroughly, the cell line can accurately show how androgen and the receptor work within the specific breast tissue.

=== Natural antioxidants affect MDA-MB-453 cell line ===
There have been several recent studies that show different substances effect on MDA-MB-453 cells. All the different substances used had a common theme: to arrest cell proliferation and induce apoptosis. One of the substances is quercetin, which is a natural antioxidant. The natural antioxidant increases the cells to enter the sub G1 phase of the cell cycle which will arrest the cell cycle and induce apoptosis. According to the data, quercetin has an anti-proliferation effect on MDA-MB-453 cells. The cells would undergo apoptosis, which concluded that quercetin could potentially have anticancer characteristics. Another substance is kaempferol, which is also a natural antioxidant. The experiment was very similar to the quercetin experiment and have similar results: anti-proliferation effect on MDA-MB-453 cells. Another researched substance is Fisetin. Fisetin is found in fruits and vegetables and can induce apoptosis through the phosphatidylinositol 3-kinase /Akt signaling pathway and inactivation of the receptor. This is important with cancer research and further studies.

== Cell biology ==
The androgen receptor is a ligand dependent transcription factor. In males, androgens are testosterone and dihydrotestosterone, and has three domains: N-terminal transcription regulation, DNA binding, and the ligand binding. The biological implications of the androgen receptors are development in several systems, such as, reproductive, cardiovascular, neural, homeopathic, musculoskeletal, and immune. The signaling can also be involved with tumor development due to unregulated gene transcription. Since the receptor targets many different pathways and systems, it is a promising role medicine and new developments.

When Heregulin (HRG), a secreted growth factor, is exposed to the MDM-MB-453 cells, a signal transduction pathway is induced. More specifically, the HRG beta 2 signals a tyrosine phosphorylation. The HRG ligand activates a GTPase activating protein.

=== Epigenetic changes ===
Cowden Syndrome is a genetic disorder that makes an individual more susceptible to cancers. The cancers can be benign or malignant, and one of the more high-risk cancers are breast cancers. The specific mutation that contributes to this syndrome is a mutation in MDM-MB-453 cells, more specifically at codon 307 makes the cells more malignant that usual. The specific mutation is a glutamate to lysine substitution. The mutation is more susceptible to epigenetic changes, such as ubiquitination, that effect localization and distribution from the cell. The study shows that this specific mutation in the MDM-MB-453 cells will make chemotherapy harder to target and the effects will not be as great.
