= List of selective estrogen receptor modulators =

Tamoxifen, a triphenylethylene derivative and the most well-known and widely used SERM.

This is a list of selective estrogen receptor modulators (SERMs).

== Approved ==
SERMs that have been approved for medical use include anordrin (+mifepristone (Zi Yun)), bazedoxifene (+conjugated estrogens (Duavee)), broparestrol (Acnestrol), clomifene (Clomid), cyclofenil (Sexovid), lasofoxifene (Fablyn), ormeloxifene (Centron, Novex, Novex-DS, Sevista), ospemifene (Osphena; deaminohydroxytoremifene), raloxifene (Evista), tamoxifen (Nolvadex), and toremifene (Fareston; 4-chlorotamoxifen).

== Clinical trials ==
SERMs that are currently under development and in clinical trials include acolbifene, afimoxifene (4-hydroxytamoxifen; metabolite of tamoxifen), elacestrant, enclomifene ((E)-clomifene), endoxifen (4-hydroxy-N-desmethyltamoxifen; metabolite of tamoxifen), and zuclomifene ((Z)-clomifene).

== Non-approved ==
SERMs that have not been approved for medical use include arzoxifene, brilanestrant, clomifenoxide (clomiphene N-oxide; metabolite of clomifene), droloxifene (3-hydroxytamoxifen), etacstil, fispemifene, GW-7604 (4-hydroxyetacstil; metabolite of etacstil), idoxifene (pyrrolidino-4-iodotamoxifen), levormeloxifene ((L)-ormeloxifene), miproxifene, nafoxidine, nitromifene (CI-628), NNC 45-0095, panomifene, pipendoxifene (ERA-923), trioxifene, and zindoxifene (D-16726).

Sivifene (A-007) was initially thought to be a SERM due to its structural similarity to tamoxifen but it was subsequently found not to bind to the estrogen receptor (ER). Tesmilifene (DPPE; YMB-1002, BMS-217380-01) is also structurally related to tamoxifen but similarly does not bind to the ER and is not a SERM.

== Structure ==
SERMs can be variously classified structurally as triphenylethylenes (tamoxifen, clomifene, toremifene, droloxifene, idoxifene, ospemifene, fispemifene, afimoxifene, others), benzothiophenes (raloxifene, arzoxifene), indoles (bazedoxifene, zindoxifene, pipendoxifene), tetrahydronaphthalenes (lasofoxifene, nafoxidine), and benzopyrans (acolbifene, ormeloxifene, levormeloxifene).
