= Nitromifene =

Chemical compound

Clinical data
- Other names: CI-628; CN-5518; CN-55945

Identifiers
- IUPAC name: 1-[2-[4-[1-(4-Methoxyphenyl)-2-nitro-2-phenylethenyl]phenoxy]ethyl]pyrrolidine
- CAS Number: 10448-84-7 5863-35-4 (citrate)
- PubChem CID: 22150
- ChemSpider: 20796
- UNII: 5FS1NJ6Q8N
- CompTox Dashboard (EPA): DTXSID50883143

Chemical and physical data
- Formula: C_{27}H_{28}N_{2}O_{4}
- Molar mass: 444.531 g·mol^{−1}
- 3D model (JSmol): Interactive image
- SMILES: COC1=CC=C(C=C1)C(=C(C2=CC=CC=C2)[N+](=O)[O-])C3=CC=C(C=C3)OCCN4CCCC4
- InChI: InChI=1S/C27H28N2O4/c1-32-24-13-9-21(10-14-24)26(27(29(30)31)23-7-3-2-4-8-23)22-11-15-25(16-12-22)33-20-19-28-17-5-6-18-28/h2-4,7-16H,5-6,17-20H2,1H3; Key:MFKMXUFMHOCZHP-UHFFFAOYSA-N

Nitromifene (INN; also as the citrate salt nitromifene citrate (USAN), developmental code names CI-628, CN-5518, CN-55945) is a nonsteroidal selective estrogen receptor modulator (SERM) related to triphenylethylenes like tamoxifen that was never marketed. It is a mixture of (E)- and (Z)-isomers that possess similar antiestrogenic activity. The drug was described in 1966. Along with tamoxifen, nafoxidine, and clomifene, it was one of the earliest SERMs.

Nitromifene has been found to dissociate from the estrogen receptor 250-fold faster than estradiol. This may be involved in its antagonistic activity at the estrogen receptor.
