= Triparanol =

Pharmaceutical drug

Clinical data
- Trade names: MER/29
- Other names: Metasqualene
- ATC code: None

Identifiers
- IUPAC name: 2-(4-Chlorophenyl)-1-[4-[2-(diethylamino)ethoxy]phenyl]-1-(4-methylphenyl)ethanol
- CAS Number: 78-41-1
- PubChem CID: 6536
- ChemSpider: 6288
- UNII: 63S8C3RXGS
- ChEBI: CHEBI:135714
- CompTox Dashboard (EPA): DTXSID6046507
- ECHA InfoCard: 100.001.014

Chemical and physical data
- Formula: C_{27}H_{32}ClNO_{2}
- Molar mass: 438.01 g·mol^{−1}
- 3D model (JSmol): Interactive image
- SMILES: CCN(CC)CCOc1ccc(C(O)(Cc2ccc(Cl)cc2)c2ccc(C)cc2)cc1
- InChI: InChI=1S/C27H32ClNO2/c1-4-29(5-2)18-19-31-26-16-12-24(13-17-26)27(30,23-10-6-21(3)7-11-23)20-22-8-14-25(28)15-9-22/h6-17,30H,4-5,18-20H2,1-3H3; Key:SYHDSBBKRLVLFF-UHFFFAOYSA-N

Triparanol (INN, BAN; brand name and development code MER/29, as well as many other brand names) was the first synthetic cholesterol-lowering drug. It was patented in 1959 and introduced in the United States in 1960. The developmental code name of triparanol, MER/29, became so well known that it became the registered trade name of the drug. It was withdrawn in 1962 due to severe adverse effects such as nausea and vomiting, vision loss due to irreversible cataracts, alopecia, skin disorders (e.g., dryness, itching, peeling, and "fish-scale" texture), and accelerated atherosclerosis. It is now considered to be obsolete.

The drug acts by inhibiting 24-dehydrocholesterol reductase, which catalyzes the final step of cholesterol biosynthesis, the conversion of desmosterol into cholesterol. Although effective in reducing cholesterol levels, this results in tissue accumulation of desmosterol, which in turn is responsible for the side effects of triparanol. Unlike statins, triparanol does not inhibit HMG-CoA reductase, the rate-limiting enzyme in cholesterol biosynthesis, and in contrast to triparanol, statins can lower cholesterol levels without resulting in accumulation of intermediates like desmosterol.

Estrogen is known to lower cholesterol levels, but produces side effects like gynecomastia and decreased libido in men. It was hoped that a drug could be developed that lacked overt estrogenic effects but still lowered cholesterol levels. Triparanol is a triphenylethanol and was derived from chlorotrianisene (TACE), a nonsteroidal triphenylethylene estrogen. The nonsteroidal triphenylethanol antiestrogen ethamoxytriphetol (MER-25) is a derivative of triparanol. The selective estrogen receptor modulator clomifene is also structurally related to triparanol. The developers of triparanol jokingly referred to it as a "non-estrogenic estrogen" due to its lipid-lowering effects without other estrogenic effects.

== See also ==
- Azacosterol
- Desmosterolosis
- X-linked ichthyosis
- Clomestrone
- Mytatrienediol
