= Miproxifene phosphate =

Chemical compound

Clinical data
- Other names: TAT-59; Iproxifene
- Routes of administration: Oral

Identifiers
- IUPAC name: [4-[(E)-1-[4-[2-(Dimethylamino)ethoxy]phenyl]-2-(4-propan-2-ylphenyl)but-1-enyl]phenyl] dihydrogen phosphate
- CAS Number: 115767-74-3
- PubChem CID: 3034829
- ChemSpider: 2299219
- UNII: QAK0B78ZCL
- KEGG: D01853
- CompTox Dashboard (EPA): DTXSID301031364

Chemical and physical data
- Formula: C_{29}H_{36}NO_{5}P
- Molar mass: 509.583 g·mol^{−1}
- 3D model (JSmol): Interactive image
- SMILES: CC/C(=C(/C1=CC=C(C=C1)OCCN(C)C)\C2=CC=C(C=C2)OP(=O)(O)O)/C3=CC=C(C=C3)C(C)C
- InChI: InChI=1S/C29H36NO5P/c1-6-28(23-9-7-22(8-10-23)21(2)3)29(25-13-17-27(18-14-25)35-36(31,32)33)24-11-15-26(16-12-24)34-20-19-30(4)5/h7-18,21H,6,19-20H2,1-5H3,(H2,31,32,33)/b29-28+; Key:QZUHFMXJZOUZFI-ZQHSETAFSA-N

Miproxifene phosphate (former developmental code name TAT-59) is a nonsteroidal selective estrogen receptor modulator (SERM) of the triphenylethylene group that was under development in Japan for the treatment of breast cancer but was abandoned and never marketed. It reached phase III clinical trials for this indication before development was discontinued. The drug is a phosphate ester and prodrug of miproxifene (DP-TAT-59) with improved water solubility that was better suited for clinical development. Miproxifene has been found to be 3- to 10-fold as potent as tamoxifen in inhibiting breast cancer cell growth in in vitro models. It is a derivative of afimoxifene (4-hydroxytamoxifen) in which an additional 4-isopropyl group is present in the β-phenyl ring.
