= Estrobin =

Chemical compound

Clinical data
- ATC code: None

Identifiers
- IUPAC name: 1,1'-(2-Bromo-2-phenyl-1,1-ethenediyl)bis(4-ethoxybenzene)
- CAS Number: 60883-74-1
- PubChem CID: 109030
- ChemSpider: 98048
- UNII: MM7V5ZUU9B
- CompTox Dashboard (EPA): DTXSID30209726

Chemical and physical data
- Formula: C_{24}H_{23}BrO_{2}
- Molar mass: 423.350 g·mol^{−1}

Estrobin, also known as α,α-di(p-ethoxyphenyl)-β-phenylbromoethylene and commonly abbreviated as DBE, is a synthetic, nonsteroidal estrogen of the triphenylethylene group that was never marketed. Chlorotrianisene, and subsequently clomifene and tamoxifen, were derived from it. Estrobin, similarly to other triphenylethylenes, is very lipophilic and hence very long-lasting in its duration of action. Similarly to chlorotrianisene, estrobin behaves as a prodrug to a much more potent estrogen in the body.

== Chemistry ==
=== Synthesis ===
The chemical synthesis of estrobin has been described:

Grignard reaction between two equivalents of 4-bromophenetole (1) and ethyl phenylacetate (2) gives 1,1-bis(4-ethoxyphenyl)-2-phenylethanol (3). Treatment with molecular bromine in glacial acetic acid then completes the synthesis of estrobin (5).

=== Related compounds ===
Other bromotriphenylethylenes with estrogenic activity include M2613, oeplexyl, and ovobrene.

The chief metabolite is thought to elicit a stronger degree of estrogenicity than estrobin itself. This analogy is like comparing methoxychlor to HPTE. In the SAR study that followed, it was elucidated that an olefinic (aka vinylic) halogen atom is not in fact actually requisite for there to be a high degree of binding to the estrogen receptor. However, in later work it was confirmed that BHPE proved to be a weak "impeded" estrogen with minor antiestrogenic potency.

== See also ==
- Broparestrol
- Diethylstilbestrol
- Stilbestrol
- Ethamoxytriphetol
- 2,8-DHHHC
