= Ethamoxytriphetol =

Chemical compound

Clinical data
- Other names: MER-25; NSC-19857
- Routes of administration: By mouth

Identifiers
- IUPAC name: 1-[4-[2-(diethylamino)ethoxy]phenyl]-2-(4-methoxyphenyl)-1-phenylethanol
- CAS Number: 67-98-1
- PubChem CID: 6222
- ChemSpider: 5987
- UNII: 2ND166F554
- KEGG: C14596
- ChEBI: CHEBI:34748
- ChEMBL: ChEMBL47647
- CompTox Dashboard (EPA): DTXSID6020806

Chemical and physical data
- Formula: C_{27}H_{33}NO_{3}
- Molar mass: 419.565 g·mol^{−1}
- 3D model (JSmol): Interactive image
- SMILES: CCN(CC)CCOC1=CC=C(C=C1)C(CC2=CC=C(C=C2)OC)(C3=CC=CC=C3)O
- InChI: InChI=1S/C27H33NO3/c1-4-28(5-2)19-20-31-26-17-13-24(14-18-26)27(29,23-9-7-6-8-10-23)21-22-11-15-25(30-3)16-12-22/h6-18,29H,4-5,19-21H2,1-3H3; Key:KDYQVUUCWUPJGE-UHFFFAOYSA-N

Ethamoxytriphetol (developmental code name MER-25) is a synthetic nonsteroidal antiestrogen that was studied clinically in the late 1950s and early 1960s but was never marketed. MER-25 was first reported in 1958, and was the first antiestrogen to be discovered. It has been described as "essentially devoid of estrogenic activity" and as having "very low estrogenic activity in all species tested". However, some estrogenic effects in the uterus have been observed, so it is not a pure antiestrogen (that is, a silent antagonist of the estrogen receptor (ER)) but is, instead, technically a selective estrogen receptor modulator (SERM). For all intents and purposes, it is a nearly pure antiestrogen, however.

MER-25 produces antifertility effects in animals, and garnered interest as a potential hormonal contraceptive. However, clinical development was discontinued due to its low potency and the incidence of unacceptable central nervous system side effects, including hallucinations and psychotic episodes, with higher doses. Undesirable gastrointestinal side effects were also described. Prior to being discontinued, the drug was also administered by Roy Hertz to three patients with metastatic breast cancer and was found to provide relief from bone pain, presumably due to dissolution of bone metastases. This was the first such study of its kind of antiestrogen therapy for the treatment of breast cancer, and it led to the development of tamoxifen for this indication a decade later. The drug was also evaluated for the purpose of ovulation induction and as a treatment of chronic mastitis and endometrial cancer before clinical development was stopped.

MER-25, a simple triphenylethanol derivative, is closely related structurally to the triphenylethylene (TPE) group of SERMs, which includes clomifene and tamoxifen. The drug, a derivative of the cholesterol-lowering agent triparanol (MER-29) (which itself was derived from the estrogen chlorotrianisene (also known as TACE)), was originally being studied in animals at Merrell Dow as a treatment for coronary artery disease. Its antiestrogenic properties were discovered serendipitously when Leonard Lerner, a research endocrinologist at the company who was employed to study nonsteroidal estrogen pharmacology, noted the structural similarity of MER-25 to estrogenic TPE derivatives and decided to test the compound for estrogenicity. Instead of the expected estrogenic effects however, Lerner found that MER-25 blocked the effects of estrogens. Lerner subsequently went on to be involved in the discovery of clomifene, the first potently antiestrogenic TPE derivative to be characterized. The structure of clomifene is similar to that of its predecessor, MER-25. Clomifene is about 10-fold more potent as an antiestrogen than MER-25.

The affinity of ethamoxytriphetol for the rat ER is approximately 0.06% relative to estradiol. For comparison, the affinities of tamoxifen and afimoxifene (4-hydroxytamoxifen) for the rat ER relative to estradiol were 1% and 252%, respectively.

Comparison of early clinical experience with antiestrogens for advanced breast cancer
Antiestrogen	Dosage	Year(s)	Response rate	Adverse effects
Ethamoxytriphetol	500–4,500 mg/day	1960	25%	Acute psychotic episodes
Clomifene	100–300 mg/day	1964–1974	34%	Risks of cataracts
Nafoxidine	180–240 mg/day	1976	31%	Cataracts, ichthyosis, photophobia
Tamoxifen	20–40 mg/day	1971–1973	31%	Transient thrombocytopenia^{a}
Footnotes: ^{a} = "The particular advantage of this drug is the low incidence of troublesome side effects (25)." "Side effects were usually trivial (26)." Sources:

== See also ==
- Fulvestrant
- Estrobin
- ICI-164384
- Broparestrol
- Raloxifene
- Nafoxidine
- Diethylstilbestrol
- Stilbestrol
