= C26H29NO2 =

The molecular formula C_{26}H_{29}NO_{2} (molar mass: 387.5139 g/mol) may refer to:

- Afimoxifene
- Droloxifene, also known as 3-hydroxytamoxifen
