= NNC 45-0095 =

Chemical compound

Clinical data
- Other names: NNC-450095
- Drug class: Selective estrogen receptor modulator

Identifiers
- IUPAC name: 4-(1-ethylpyrrolo[2,1,5-cd]indolizin-2-yl)phenol
- CAS Number: 217318-90-6
- PubChem CID: 9903336
- ChemSpider: 8078990
- UNII: IS4M82C29X
- ChEMBL: ChEMBL420017
- CompTox Dashboard (EPA): DTXSID60432621

Chemical and physical data
- Formula: C_{18}H_{15}NO
- Molar mass: 261.324 g·mol^{−1}
- 3D model (JSmol): Interactive image
- SMILES: CCC1=C(C2=CC=C3N2C1=CC=C3)C4=CC=C(C=C4)O
- InChI: InChI=1S/C18H15NO/c1-2-15-16-5-3-4-13-8-11-17(19(13)16)18(15)12-6-9-14(20)10-7-12/h3-11,20H,2H2,1H3; Key:GBHFDPQPLXKNIU-UHFFFAOYSA-N

NC 45-0095 is a synthetic nonsteroidal selective estrogen receptor modulator (SERM) which was under development by Novo for the treatment of postmenopausal osteoporosis but was never marketed. It is a partial agonist of the estrogen receptor (IC_{50} (for binding inhibition) = 9.5 nM; EC_{50} = 13 nM) with mixed estrogenic and antiestrogenic activity, and shows full estrogenic activity in bone and uterus (E_{max} (relative to moxestrol, in Ishikawa endometrial cancer cell line) = 105%). The compound is a pyrrolo indolizine derivative. Its development was discontinued by 2003.

== See also ==
- List of selective estrogen receptor modulators
