= Cyclofenil =

Chemical compound

Clinical data
- Trade names: Sexovid, others
- Other names: Cyclophenil; F-6066; H-3452; ICI-48213; bis(p-Acetoxyphenyl)-cyclohexylidenemethane
- AHFS/Drugs.com: International Drug Names
- Routes of administration: By mouth
- Drug class: Selective estrogen receptor modulator; Progonadotropin
- ATC code: G03GB01 (WHO)

Pharmacokinetic data
- Elimination half-life: 18–29 hours

Identifiers
- IUPAC name: [4-[(4-Acetoxyphenyl)-cyclohexylidene-methyl]phenyl] acetate
- CAS Number: 2624-43-3
- PubChem CID: 2898
- ChemSpider: 2795
- UNII: J468V64WZ1
- KEGG: D01281
- ChEMBL: ChEMBL141305
- CompTox Dashboard (EPA): DTXSID4022866
- ECHA InfoCard: 100.018.264

Chemical and physical data
- Formula: C_{23}H_{24}O_{4}
- Molar mass: 364.441 g·mol^{−1}
- 3D model (JSmol): Interactive image
- SMILES: O=C(Oc3ccc(C(/c1ccc(OC(=O)C)cc1)=C2\CCCCC2)cc3)C

Cyclofenil, sold under the brand name Sexovid among others, is a selective estrogen receptor modulator (SERM) medication which is used as a gonadotropin stimulant or ovulation inducer and in menopausal hormone therapy in women. It is mostly no longer available. The medication is taken by mouth.

Side effects of cyclofenil include liver toxicity among others. It is a selective estrogen receptor modulator (SERM) and hence is a mixed agonist–antagonist of the estrogen receptor (ER), the biological target of estrogens like estradiol. It has antiestrogenic effects on the hypothalamic–pituitary–gonadal axis and hence can increase sex hormone production and stimulate ovulation.

Cyclofenil was introduced for medical use in 1970. It has been mostly discontinued, but remains available in a few countries, including Brazil, Italy, and Japan. It has been used as a doping agent by male athletes.

== Medical use ==
Cyclofenil is used to treat menstrual disturbances and anovulatory infertility caused by insufficiency of the hypothalamic–pituitary–gonadal axis in women. It has also been used to treat menopausal symptoms. The medication is generally used at a dosage of 400 to 600 mg per day.

=== Available forms ===
Cyclofenil has been available in the form of 100, 200, and 400 mg oral tablets.

== Non-medical use ==
Cyclofenil has been used by male athletes to increase testosterone levels. It is not effective for this purpose in women.

== Contraindications ==
Cyclofenil is contraindicated during pregnancy and in those with severe liver disease and unexplained uterine bleeding.

== Side effects ==
Cyclofenil is associated with a relatively high incidence of hepatotoxicity. Biochemical signs of undesirable liver changes have been observed in 35% or more of individuals and 1% of individuals experience overt hepatitis.

== Pharmacology ==
=== Pharmacodynamics ===
Cyclofenil is a SERM, or a mixed agonist and antagonist of the estrogen receptors (ERs). It is described as a relatively weak/mild SERM. The medication is generally less effective than other SERMs. The medication is an "impeded estrogen" and is thought to work as a progonadotropin by blocking the actions of estrogens in the pituitary gland and hypothalamus, thereby disinhibiting release of the gonadotropins luteinizing hormone and follicle-stimulating hormone. In men, cyclofenil can increase testosterone levels due its progonadotropic effects.

=== Pharmacokinetics ===
In terms of distribution, cyclofenil acts both centrally and peripherally. The elimination half-life of cyclofenil after a single 200 mg dose is 18 to 29 hours.

== Chemistry ==
Cyclofenil is a nonsteroidal SERM and is closely related structurally to triphenylethylene SERMs like clomifene and tamoxifen. It has been referred to as a diphenylethylene derivative, differing from triphenylethylenes only by the replacement of one of the phenyl rings with a cyclohexane ring.

== History ==
Cyclofenil was first introduced for medical use in 1970 under the brand name Ondogyne in France. Subsequently, it was introduced throughout the world under a variety of other brand names, including its most well-known brand name Sexovid.

== Society and culture ==
=== Generic names ===
Cyclofenil is the English generic name of the drug and its INN, USAN, and BAN.

=== Brand names ===
Cyclofenil has been marketed under a variety of brand names including Ciclifen, Fertodur, Gyneuro, Klofenil, Menoferil, Menopax, Neoclym, Oginex, Ondonid, Ondogyne, Rehibin, Sexadieno, Sexovar, and Sexovid.

=== Availability ===
Cyclofenil remains available today only in Brazil, Italy, and Japan. In the past, it has also been available in France, Germany, Mexico, Sweden, Switzerland, Turkey, and the United Kingdom.

=== Regulation ===
Cyclofenil is included on the World Anti-Doping Agency list of illegal doping agents in sport.

== Research ==
Cyclofenil was investigated as a possible treatment for scleroderma in the 1980s, but was found to be ineffective. Later study of its efficacy in treating Raynaud's phenomenon in people with scleroderma also found no significant benefit.
