= C29H35NO2 =

The molecular formula C_{29}H_{35}NO_{2} may refer to:

- Mifepristone, a medication typically used in combination to bring about an abortion during pregnancy
- Miproxifene, a nonsteroidal selective estrogen receptor modulator
