= C30H35NO3 =

The molecular formula C_{30}H_{35}NO_{3} (molar mass: 457.604 g/mol, exact mass: 457.2617 u) may refer to:

- Levormeloxifene
- Ormeloxifene (or centchroman)
