= Nonsteroidal =

Type of drug

A nonsteroidal compound is a drug that is neither a steroid nor a steroid derivative. Nonsteroidal anti-inflammatory drugs (NSAIDs) are distinguished from corticosteroids as a class of anti-inflammatory agents.

== List of nonsteroidal steroid receptor modulators ==
Examples include the following:

- Estrogens: benzestrol, bifluranol, estrobin (DBE), diethylstilbestrol (stilbestrol), dienestrol, erteberel, fosfestrol, hexestrol (dihydroxystilbestrol), methallenestril, methestrol, methestrol dipropionate, paroxypropione, prinaberel, and triphenylethylene, as well as many xenoestrogens
- SERMs: acolbifene, afimoxifene, arzoxifene, bazedoxifene, broparestrol, chlorotrianisene, clomifene, clomifenoxide, cyclofenil, droloxifene, enclomifene, endoxifen, ethamoxytriphetol, fispemifene, idoxifene, lasofoxifene, levormeloxifene, miproxifene, nafoxidine, nitromifene, ormeloxifene, ospemifene, panomifene, pipendoxifene, raloxifene, tamoxifen, toremifene, trioxifene, zindoxifene, zuclomifene
- Antiandrogens: apalutamide, bicalutamide, cimetidine, darolutamide, DIMP, enzalutamide, EPI-001, EPI-506, flutamide, hydroxyflutamide, inocoterone, inocoterone acetate, nilutamide, RU-58642, RU-58841, and topilutamide
- SARMs: AC-262,356, acetothiolutamide, andarine, BMS-564,929, enobosarm (ostarine), LGD-2226, LGD-3303, LGD-4033, S-23, and S-40503
- Aromatase inhibitors: anastrozole, aminoglutethimide, fadrozole, finrozole, letrozole, liarozole, norendoxifen, rogletimide (pyridoglutethimide), vorozole
- Other steroidogenesis inhibitors: aminoglutethimide, ketoconazole, orteronel, seviteronel, others
- Miscellaneous: tanaproget (progestogen), finerenone (antimineralocorticoid), esaxerenone (antimineralocorticoid), apararenone (antimineralocorticoid), AZD5423 (glucocorticoid), mapracorat (SGRM)

== See also ==
- Nonsteroidal antiandrogen
- Nonsteroidal estrogen
