= Clomifenoxide =

Chemical compound

Clinical data
- Other names: Clomifene N-oxide

Identifiers
- IUPAC name: (E,Z)-2-(p-(2-Chloro-1,2-diphenylvinyl)phenoxy)triethylamine N-oxide
- CAS Number: 97642-74-5
- PubChem CID: 9979613
- ChemSpider: 8155205
- UNII: L88W2ZR0TI
- CompTox Dashboard (EPA): DTXSID70869303

Chemical and physical data
- Formula: C_{26}H_{28}ClNO_{2}
- Molar mass: 421.97 g·mol^{−1}
- 3D model (JSmol): Interactive image
- SMILES: [N+](CCOc1ccc(cc1)C(=C(/c1ccccc1)Cl)\c1ccccc1)(CC)(CC)[O-]
- InChI: InChI=1S/C26H28ClNO2/c1-3-28(29,4-2)19-20-30-24-17-15-22(16-18-24)25(21-11-7-5-8-12-21)26(27)23-13-9-6-10-14-23/h5-18H,3-4,19-20H2,1-2H3/b26-25-; Key:PGHWCZITRQNIPM-QPLCGJKRSA-N

Clomifenoxide (INN), also known as clomifene N-oxide, is a nonsteroidal selective estrogen receptor modulator (SERM) of the triphenylethylene group that is described as an antiestrogen and "gonad stimulant" and was never marketed. It is an active metabolite of clomifene.

== See also ==
- Afimoxifene
- Endoxifen
