= Zuclomifene =

Chemical compound

Clinical data
- Other names: Zuclomiphene; trans-Clomifene; Transclomiphene; (Z)-Clomifene; ICI-46476; RMI-16312; Zuclomifene citrate; Zuclomiphene citrate
- Routes of administration: Oral

Identifiers
- IUPAC name: 2-[4-[(Z)-2-Chloro-1,2-diphenylethenyl]phenoxy]-N,N-diethylethanamine
- CAS Number: 15690-55-8
- PubChem CID: 1548955
- ChemSpider: 1265969
- UNII: 3JU1DU3652
- KEGG: D09037
- CompTox Dashboard (EPA): DTXSID601317947

Chemical and physical data
- Formula: C_{26}H_{28}ClNO
- Molar mass: 405.97 g·mol^{−1}
- 3D model (JSmol): Interactive image
- SMILES: CCN(CC)CCOC1=CC=C(C=C1)/C(=C(/C2=CC=CC=C2)\Cl)/C3=CC=CC=C3
- InChI: InChI=1S/C26H28ClNO/c1-3-28(4-2)19-20-29-24-17-15-22(16-18-24)25(21-11-7-5-8-12-21)26(27)23-13-9-6-10-14-23/h5-18H,3-4,19-20H2,1-2H3/b26-25-; Key:GKIRPKYJQBWNGO-QPLCGJKRSA-N

Zuclomifene (INN; or zuclomiphene (USAN)) is a nonsteroidal selective estrogen receptor modulator (SERM) of the triphenylethylene group that was never marketed. It is one of the two stereoisomers of clomifene, which itself is a mixture of 38% zuclomifene and 62% enclomifene. Zuclomifene is the (Z)-stereoisomer of clomifene, while enclomifene is the (E)-stereoisomer. Whereas zuclomifene is described as mildly estrogenic, enclomifene is described as antiestrogenic. In accordance, unlike enclomifene, zuclomifene is antigonadotropic due to activation of the estrogen receptor and reduces testosterone levels in men. It is also about five times more potent than enclomifene in inducing ovulation.
