= Droloxifene =

Chemical compound

Clinical data
- Other names: FK-435; ICI-79280; K-060; K-21060E; RP-60850; 3-Hydroxytamoxifen; 3-OH-TAM
- Routes of administration: Oral

Pharmacokinetic data
- Elimination half-life: 19–37 hours

Identifiers
- IUPAC name: 3-[(E)-1-[4-[2-(Dimethylamino)ethoxy]phenyl]-2-phenylbut-1-enyl]phenol
- CAS Number: 82413-20-5
- PubChem CID: 3033767
- ChemSpider: 2298372
- UNII: 0M67U6Z98F
- KEGG: D03911
- ChEBI: CHEBI:34731
- ChEMBL: ChEMBL487
- CompTox Dashboard (EPA): DTXSID9022441
- ECHA InfoCard: 100.102.640

Chemical and physical data
- Formula: C_{26}H_{29}NO_{2}
- Molar mass: 387.523 g·mol^{−1}
- 3D model (JSmol): Interactive image
- SMILES: CC/C(=C(/C1=CC=C(C=C1)OCCN(C)C)\C2=CC(=CC=C2)O)/C3=CC=CC=C3
- InChI: InChI=1S/C26H29NO2/c1-4-25(20-9-6-5-7-10-20)26(22-11-8-12-23(28)19-22)21-13-15-24(16-14-21)29-18-17-27(2)3/h5-16,19,28H,4,17-18H2,1-3H3/b26-25+; Key:ZQZFYGIXNQKOAV-OCEACIFDSA-N

Droloxifene (INN, USAN) (former developmental code names FK-435, ICI-79280, K-060, K-21060E, RP-60850), also known as 3-hydroxytamoxifen, is a nonsteroidal selective estrogen receptor modulator (SERM) of the triphenylethylene group that was developed originally in Germany and later in Japan for the treatment of breast cancer, osteoporosis in men and postmenopausal women, and cardiovascular disorders but was abandoned and never marketed. It reached phase II and phase III clinical trials for these indications before development was discontinued in 2000. The drug was found to be significantly less effective than tamoxifen in the treatment of breast cancer in two phase III clinical trials.

Droloxifene is an analogue of tamoxifen, specifically 3-hydroxytamoxifen, but has been said to have 10- to 60-fold increased affinity for the estrogen receptor and reduced partial estrogen agonistic activity. The affinity of droloxifene for the estrogen receptor ranges from 0.2 to 15.2% relative to estradiol in different studies. For comparison, the ranges are 0.06 to 16% for tamoxifen and 0.1 to 12% for clomifene. Droloxifene causes a dose-dependent decrease in luteinizing hormone and follicle-stimulating hormone levels, indicating that it has antigonadotropic activity, and dose-dependently increases sex hormone-binding globulin levels, indicating that it has estrogenic activity in the liver. Similarly to tamoxifen, droloxifene has partial estrogenic effects in the uterus. Unlike tamoxifen, droloxifene does not produce DNA adduct or liver tumors in animals.

== See also ==
- Afimoxifene (4-hydroxytamoxifen)
- Endoxifen (N-desmethyl-4-hydroxytamoxifen)
