= Tissue-selective estrogen complex =

A tissue-selective estrogen complex (TSEC) is a combination of an estrogen, such as estradiol or conjugated estrogens, and a selective estrogen receptor modulator (SERM), such as tamoxifen, raloxifene, or bazedoxifene. It is thought to have different tissue pattern of estrogenic and antiestrogenic effects than that of either the estrogen or the SERM alone. An example of a clinically used TSEC is conjugated estrogens/bazedoxifene (brand name Duavee).
