= Idoxifene =

Pharmaceutical compound

Clinical data
- Other names: CB-7432, SB-223030; Pyrrolidino-4-iodotamoxifen; 4-Iodopyrrolidinotamoxifen
- Routes of administration: Oral

Pharmacokinetic data
- Elimination half-life: Acute: 15 hours Chronic: 23 days

Identifiers
- IUPAC name: 1-[2-[4-[(E)-1-(4-iodophenyl)-2-phenylbut-1-enyl]phenoxy]ethyl]pyrrolidine
- CAS Number: 116057-75-1
- PubChem CID: 3034011
- ChemSpider: 2298565
- UNII: 456UXE9867
- KEGG: D04496
- ChEMBL: ChEMBL6318
- CompTox Dashboard (EPA): DTXSID5043926

Chemical and physical data
- Formula: C_{28}H_{30}INO
- Molar mass: 523.458 g·mol^{−1}
- 3D model (JSmol): Interactive image
- SMILES: CC/C(=C(/C1=CC=C(C=C1)OCCN2CCCC2)\C3=CC=C(C=C3)I)/C4=CC=CC=C4
- InChI: InChI=1S/C28H30INO/c1-2-27(22-8-4-3-5-9-22)28(23-10-14-25(29)15-11-23)24-12-16-26(17-13-24)31-21-20-30-18-6-7-19-30/h3-5,8-17H,2,6-7,18-21H2,1H3/b28-27-; Key:JJKOTMDDZAJTGQ-DQSJHHFOSA-N

Idoxifene (INN, USAN, BAN) (former developmental code names CB-7432, SB-223030), also known as pyrrolidino-4-iodotamoxifen, is a nonsteroidal selective estrogen receptor modulator (SERM) of the triphenylethylene group which was under development for the treatment of breast cancer and postmenopausal osteoporosis but was never marketed. It reached phase III clinical trials for postmenopausal osteoporosis and phase II clinical trials for breast cancer before development was discontinued in 1999 due to insufficient effectiveness in both cases.

== Chemistry ==
=== Synthesis ===
A large-scale chemical synthesis of idoxifene has been devised.
