= Panomifene =

Chemical compound

Clinical data
- Other names: GYKI-13504; EGIS-5650

Identifiers
- IUPAC name: 2-[2-[4-[(E)-3,3,3-trifluoro-1,2-diphenylprop-1-enyl]phenoxy]ethylamino]ethanol
- CAS Number: 77599-17-8
- PubChem CID: 3033654
- ChemSpider: 2298282
- UNII: GCW5E728OC
- ChEMBL: ChEMBL2105273
- CompTox Dashboard (EPA): DTXSID401032965

Chemical and physical data
- Formula: C_{25}H_{24}F_{3}NO_{2}
- Molar mass: 427.467 g·mol^{−1}
- 3D model (JSmol): Interactive image
- SMILES: C1=CC=C(C=C1)/C(=C(/C2=CC=CC=C2)\C(F)(F)F)/C3=CC=C(C=C3)OCCNCCO
- InChI: InChI=1S/C25H24F3NO2/c26-25(27,28)24(21-9-5-2-6-10-21)23(19-7-3-1-4-8-19)20-11-13-22(14-12-20)31-18-16-29-15-17-30/h1-14,29-30H,15-18H2/b24-23+; Key:MHXVDXXARZCVRK-WCWDXBQESA-N

Panomifene (INN; developmental codes GYKI 13504 and EGIS 5650) is a nonsteroidal selective estrogen receptor modulator (SERM) of the triphenylethylene group related to tamoxifen that was under development as an antineoplastic agent by Egis Pharmaceuticals and IVAX Drug Research Institute in the 1990s for the treatment of breast cancer, but it was never marketed. It reached phase II clinical trials before development was terminated. The drug was described in 1981.
