= Triphenylethanol =

Names
- Preferred IUPAC name 1,1,2-Triphenylethan-1-ol

Identifiers
| CAS Number | 4428-13-1 |
| 3D model (JSmol) | Interactive image |
| ChEMBL | ChEMBL118088 |
| ChemSpider | 214300 |
| PubChem CID | 245013 |
| CompTox Dashboard (EPA) | DTXSID60871076 |
- InChI: InChI=1S/C20H18O/c21-20(18-12-6-2-7-13-18,19-14-8-3-9-15-19)16-17-10-4-1-5-11-17/h1-15,21H,16H2 Key: QMPKJVBRCQVFLL-UHFFFAOYSA-N
- SMILES: C1=CC=C(C=C1)CC(C2=CC=CC=C2)(C3=CC=CC=C3)O

Properties
| Chemical formula | C_{20}H_{18}O |
| Molar mass | 274.363 g·mol^{−1} |
- Except where otherwise noted, data are given for materials in their standard state (at 25 °C [77 °F], 100 kPa). Infobox references

Triphenylethanol, or 1,1,2-triphenylethanol, is an organic compound with a condensed structural formula of (C_{6}H_{5})_{2}C(OH)CH_{2}C_{6}H_{5}, and is related to triphenylethylene, from which it can be prepared by hydration. It is the structural analog of two drugs, the never-marketed antiestrogen ethamoxytriphetol (MER-25) and the withdrawn lipid-lowering agent triparanol, as both contain the 1,1,2-triphenylethanol moiety within their structure.

There are three isomeric compounds with a "triphenylethanol" structure:

- 1,1,2-triphenylethanol;
- 1,2,2-triphenylethanol, with a condensed structural formula of (C_{6}H_{5})_{2}CHCH(C_{6}H_{5})OH, which exists as a pair of enantiomers; and,
- 2,2,2-triphenylethanol, with a condensed structural formula of (C_{6}H_{5})_{3}CCH_{2}OH.
