= Fispemifene =

Chemical compound

Clinical data
- Other names: HM-101

Identifiers
- IUPAC name: 2-(2-(4-((1Z)-4-Chloro-1,2-diphenylbut-1-enyl)phenoxy)ethoxy)ethanol
- CAS Number: 341524-89-8
- PubChem CID: 9954033
- ChemSpider: 8129643
- UNII: 3VZ2833V08
- KEGG: D10008
- ChEMBL: ChEMBL2107341
- CompTox Dashboard (EPA): DTXSID90870330

Chemical and physical data
- Formula: C_{26}H_{27}ClO_{3}
- Molar mass: 422.95 g·mol^{−1}
- 3D model (JSmol): Interactive image
- SMILES: C1=CC=C(C=C1)/C(=C(/C2=CC=CC=C2)\C3=CC=C(C=C3)OCCOCCO)/CCCl
- InChI: InChI=1S/C26H27ClO3/c27-16-15-25(21-7-3-1-4-8-21)26(22-9-5-2-6-10-22)23-11-13-24(14-12-23)30-20-19-29-18-17-28/h1-14,28H,15-20H2/b26-25-; Key:NKZTZAQIKKGTDB-QPLCGJKRSA-N

Fispemifene (INN, USAN) (developmental code name HM-101) is a nonsteroidal selective estrogen receptor modulator (SERM) of the triphenylethylene group that was developed for the treatment of male hypogonadism but was abandoned and never marketed. It reached phase II clinical trials for this indication before development was terminated in March 2016. The drug failed to achieve statistical significance on key effectiveness endpoints in clinical trials and was discontinued by its developer for strategic reasons.

== See also ==
- Ospemifene
