= ICI-164384 =

Chemical compound

Clinical data
- Other names: N-n-Butyl-N-methyl-11-(3,17β-dihydroxyestra-1,3,5(10)-trien-7α-yl)undecanamide

Identifiers
- IUPAC name: N-butyl-11-[(7R,8R,9S,13S,14S,17S)-3,17-dihydroxy-13-methyl-6,7,8,9,11,12,14,15,16,17-decahydrocyclopenta[a]phenanthren-7-yl]-N-methylundecanamide
- CAS Number: 98007-99-9
- PubChem CID: 104772
- ChemSpider: 94580
- UNII: 84LT43726C
- KEGG: C14758
- ChEBI: CHEBI:40710
- ChEMBL: ChEMBL1222035
- CompTox Dashboard (EPA): DTXSID3022376

Chemical and physical data
- Formula: C_{34}H_{55}NO_{3}
- Molar mass: 525.818 g·mol^{−1}
- 3D model (JSmol): Interactive image
- SMILES: CCCCN(C)C(=O)CCCCCCCCCC[C@@H]1CC2=C(C=CC(=C2)O)[C@@H]3[C@@H]1[C@@H]4CC[C@@H]([C@]4(CC3)C)O
- InChI: InChI=1S/C34H55NO3/c1-4-5-22-35(3)32(38)15-13-11-9-7-6-8-10-12-14-25-23-26-24-27(36)16-17-28(26)29-20-21-34(2)30(33(25)29)18-19-31(34)37/h16-17,24-25,29-31,33,36-37H,4-15,18-23H2,1-3H3/t25-,29-,30+,31+,33-,34+/m1/s1; Key:BVVFOLSZMQVDKV-KXQIQQEYSA-N

ICI-164384, also known as N-n-butyl-N-methyl-11-(3,17β-dihydroxyestra-1,3,5(10)-trien-7α-yl)undecanamide, is a steroidal antiestrogen and a synthetic derivative of estradiol which is closely related to fulvestrant and was never marketed. It is a silent antagonist of the estrogen receptor (ER) with no intrinsic estrogenic activity and hence is a pure antiestrogen, unlike selective estrogen receptor modulators (SERMs) like tamoxifen. The drug was under development by AstraZeneca for the treatment of breast cancer but was discontinued in favor of fulvestrant, which is very similar to ICI-164384 but is more potent in comparison.

== See also ==
- Cytestrol acetate
- Ethamoxytriphetol
- TAS-108
