= Miproxifene =

Chemical compound

Clinical data
- Other names: DP-TAT-59

Identifiers
- IUPAC name: 4-[(Z)-1-[4-[2-(Dimethylamino)ethoxy]phenyl]-2-(4-propan-2-ylphenyl)but-1-enyl]phenol
- CAS Number: 129612-87-9
- PubChem CID: 3037015
- ChemSpider: 2300875
- UNII: BGJ4Z7930W
- ChEMBL: ChEMBL2074961
- CompTox Dashboard (EPA): DTXSID301318241

Chemical and physical data
- Formula: C_{29}H_{35}NO_{2}
- Molar mass: 429.604 g·mol^{−1}
- 3D model (JSmol): Interactive image
- SMILES: CC/C(=C(\C1=CC=C(C=C1)O)/C2=CC=C(C=C2)OCCN(C)C)/C3=CC=C(C=C3)C(C)C
- InChI: InChI=1S/C29H35NO2/c1-6-28(23-9-7-22(8-10-23)21(2)3)29(24-11-15-26(31)16-12-24)25-13-17-27(18-14-25)32-20-19-30(4)5/h7-18,21,31H,6,19-20H2,1-5H3/b29-28-; Key:FVVPWVFWOOMXEZ-ZIADKAODSA-N

Miproxifene (INN; former developmental code DP-TAT-59) is a nonsteroidal selective estrogen receptor modulator (SERM) of the triphenylethylene group that was never marketed. It is a derivative of afimoxifene (4-hydroxytamoxifen) in which an additional 4-isopropyl group is present in the β-phenyl ring. The drug has been found to be 3- to 10-fold more potent than tamoxifen in inhibiting breast cancer cell growth in in vitro models. Miproxifene is the active metabolite of miproxifene phosphate (TAT-59), a phosphate ester and prodrug of miproxifene that was developed to improve its water solubility. Miproxifene phosphate was under development for the treatment of breast cancer and reached phase III clinical trials for this indication but development was discontinued.
