= Broparestrol =

Chemical compound

Clinical data
- Trade names: Acnestrol, Longestrol
- Other names: LN-107; α-Bromo-α,β-diphenyl-β-p-ethylphenylethylene; BDPE
- Pregnancy category: X (Contraindicated)
- Routes of administration: By mouth
- Drug class: Selective estrogen receptor modulator

Legal status
- Legal status: In general: ℞ (Prescription only)

Identifiers
- IUPAC name: 1-(2-bromo-1,2-diphenylethenyl)-4-ethylbenzene
- CAS Number: 479-68-5; Z-isomer: 22393-63-1
- PubChem CID: 3032769
- ChemSpider: 2297663
- UNII: 4F4UXV47YI; Z-isomer: D6CYJ2NI2L
- CompTox Dashboard (EPA): DTXSID201203500

Chemical and physical data
- Formula: C_{22}H_{19}Br
- Molar mass: 363.298 g·mol^{−1}
- 3D model (JSmol): Interactive image
- SMILES: CCc1ccc(cc1)/C(=C(\c2ccccc2)/Br)/c3ccccc3
- InChI: InChI=1S/C22H19Br/c1-2-17-13-15-19(16-14-17)21(18-9-5-3-6-10-18)22(23)20-11-7-4-8-12-20/h3-16H,2H2,1H3/b22-21+; Key:OQCYTSHIQNPJIC-QURGRASLSA-N

Broparestrol (INN) (brand names Acnestrol, Longestrol; former developmental code name LN-107), also known as α-bromo-α,β-diphenyl-β-p-ethylphenylethylene (BDPE), is a synthetic, nonsteroidal selective estrogen receptor modulator (SERM) of the triphenylethylene group that has been used in Europe as a dermatological agent and for the treatment of breast cancer. The drug is described as slightly estrogenic and potently antiestrogenic, and inhibits mammary gland development and suppresses prolactin levels in animals. It is structurally related to clomifene and diethylstilbestrol. Broparestrol is a mixture of E- and Z- isomers (LN-1643 and LN-2299, respectively), both of which are active, and are similarly antiestrogenic but, unlike broparestrol, were never marketed.

== See also ==
- List of selective estrogen receptor modulators
