= M2613 =

Chemical compound

Clinical data
- Other names: M-2613; Methoxyethoxy-triphenylbromoethylene
- Drug class: Nonsteroidal estrogen

Identifiers
- IUPAC name: 1-Bromo-2-(p-ethoxyphenyl)-2-(p-methoxyphenyl)-1-phenylethylene
- CAS Number: 114795-29-8

Chemical and physical data
- Formula: C_{23}H_{21}BrO_{2}
- Molar mass: 409.323 g·mol^{−1}
- 3D model (JSmol): Interactive image
- SMILES: c1ccccc1C(Br)=C(c1ccc(OC)cc1)c1ccc(OCC)cc1
- InChI: InChI=InChI=1S/C23H21BrO2/c1-3-26-21-15-11-18(12-16-21)22(17-9-13-20(25-2)14-10-17)23(24)19-7-5-4-6-8-19/h4-16H,3H2,1-2H3; Key:SPHDSWQIYGZLBR-UHFFFAOYSA-N

M2613 is a nonsteroidal estrogen derived from triphenylbromoethylene which was studied for the treatment of breast cancer in women in the 1940s, but was never marketed.

== Chemistry ==
=== Synthesis ===
The chemical synthesis of M2613 has been described:

The Grignard reaction between 1-(4-Ethoxyphenyl)-2-phenylethanone [38495-73-7] (1) and 4-Bromoanisole [104-92-7] (2) gives 3. Condensation with molecular bromine in the presence of glacial acetic acid completes the synthesis of M2613 (4). Alternately, Grignard reaction between 4-Ethoxy-4'-methoxybenzophenone [52886-92-7] (4) and benzyl bromide [100-39-0] (5) also yields 3.

== See also ==
- Estrobin
