= Trioxifene =

Chemical compound

Clinical data
- Other names: LY-133,314
- Routes of administration: Oral
- ATC code: none

Identifiers
- IUPAC name: [2-(4-methoxyphenyl)-3,4-dihydronaphthalen-1-yl]-[4-(2-pyrrolidin-1-ylethoxy)phenyl]methanone
- CAS Number: 63619-84-1 68307-81-3 (mesylate)
- PubChem CID: 50139
- ChemSpider: 45471
- UNII: R0130F043H
- CompTox Dashboard (EPA): DTXSID30212997

Chemical and physical data
- Formula: C_{30}H_{31}NO_{3}
- Molar mass: 453.582 g·mol^{−1}

Trioxifene (INN; developmental code LY-133,314), or as the salt trioxifene mesylate (USAN), is a selective estrogen receptor modulator (SERM) with competitive binding activity against estradiol for the ERα and antagonistic activity against ERα-mediated gene expression, that was under preclinical and clinical development by Eli Lilly and Company for breast cancer and prostate cancer, but was abandoned. Its affinity for the rat estrogen receptor was reported to be 20% relative to estradiol.
