= Nafoxidine =

Chemical compound

Clinical data
- Other names: U-11,000A; NSC-70735
- Routes of administration: By mouth
- ATC code: None

Identifiers
- IUPAC name: 1-[2-[4-(6-Methoxy-2-phenyl-3,4-dihydronaphthalen-1-yl)phenoxy]ethyl]pyrrolidine
- CAS Number: 1845-11-0
- PubChem CID: 4416
- IUPHAR/BPS: 4263
- ChemSpider: 4263
- UNII: 4RIY10WM82
- KEGG: C14212
- ChEBI: CHEBI:34881
- ChEMBL: ChEMBL28211
- CompTox Dashboard (EPA): DTXSID7022386
- ECHA InfoCard: 100.222.756

Chemical and physical data
- Formula: C_{29}H_{31}NO_{2}
- Molar mass: 425.572 g·mol^{−1}
- 3D model (JSmol): Interactive image
- SMILES: COC1=CC2=C(C=C1)C(=C(CC2)C3=CC=CC=C3)C4=CC=C(C=C4)OCCN5CCCC5
- InChI: InChI=1S/C29H31NO2/c1-31-26-14-16-28-24(21-26)11-15-27(22-7-3-2-4-8-22)29(28)23-9-12-25(13-10-23)32-20-19-30-17-5-6-18-30/h2-4,7-10,12-14,16,21H,5-6,11,15,17-20H2,1H3; Key:JEYWNNAZDLFBFF-UHFFFAOYSA-N

Nafoxidine (INN; developmental code names U-11,000A) or nafoxidine hydrochloride (USAN) is a nonsteroidal selective estrogen receptor modulator (SERM) or partial antiestrogen of the triphenylethylene group that was developed for the treatment of advanced breast cancer by Upjohn in the 1970s but was never marketed. It was developed at around the same time as tamoxifen and clomifene, which are also triphenylethylene derivatives. The drug was originally synthesized by the fertility control program at Upjohn as a postcoital contraceptive, but was subsequently repurposed for the treatment of breast cancer. Nafoxidine was assessed in clinical trials in the treatment of breast cancer and was found to be effective. However, it produced side effects including ichthyosis, partial hair loss, and phototoxicity of the skin in almost all patients, and this resulted in the discontinuation of its development.

Nafoxidine is a long-acting estrogen receptor ligand, with a nuclear retention in the range of 24 to 48 hours or more.

Comparison of early clinical experience with antiestrogens for advanced breast cancer
Antiestrogen	Dosage	Year(s)	Response rate	Adverse effects
Ethamoxytriphetol	500–4,500 mg/day	1960	25%	Acute psychotic episodes
Clomifene	100–300 mg/day	1964–1974	34%	Risks of cataracts
Nafoxidine	180–240 mg/day	1976	31%	Cataracts, ichthyosis, photophobia
Tamoxifen	20–40 mg/day	1971–1973	31%	Transient thrombocytopenia^{a}
Footnotes: ^{a} = "The particular advantage of this drug is the low incidence of troublesome side effects (25)." "Side effects were usually trivial (26)." Sources:
