= Levormeloxifene =

Chemical compound

Clinical data
- Other names: Levomeloxifene; 6720-CDRI; NNC-460020

Identifiers
- IUPAC name: 1-(2-[4-[(3R,4R)-7-Methoxy-2,2-dimethyl-3-phenyl-3,4-dihydro-2H-chromen-4-yl]phenoxy]ethyl)pyrrolidine
- CAS Number: 78994-23-7
- PubChem CID: 35805
- ChemSpider: 32935
- UNII: 9512UKZ352
- ChEMBL: ChEMBL301327
- CompTox Dashboard (EPA): DTXSID301317017 DTXSID6046844, DTXSID301317017

Chemical and physical data
- Formula: C_{30}H_{35}NO_{3}
- Molar mass: 457.614 g·mol^{−1}
- 3D model (JSmol): Interactive image
- SMILES: O(c1ccc(cc1)[C@@H]3c4c(OC([C@H]3c2ccccc2)(C)C)cc(OC)cc4)CCN5CCCC5
- InChI: InChI=1S/C30H35NO3/c1-30(2)29(23-9-5-4-6-10-23)28(26-16-15-25(32-3)21-27(26)34-30)22-11-13-24(14-12-22)33-20-19-31-17-7-8-18-31/h4-6,9-16,21,28-29H,7-8,17-20H2,1-3H3/t28-,29+/m1/s1; Key:XZEUAXYWNKYKPL-WDYNHAJCSA-N

Levormeloxifene (INN; developmental code names 6720-CDRI, NNC-460020) is a selective estrogen receptor modulator (SERM) which was being developed as an alternative to estrogen replacement therapy for the treatment and prevention of postmenopausal bone loss but did not complete development and hence was never marketed. The development was stopped because of a high incidence of gynecological side effects during clinical trials. Levormeloxifene is the levorotatory enantiomer of ormeloxifene, which, in contrast, has been marketed, though rather as a hormonal contraceptive.

== See also ==
- List of selective estrogen receptor modulators
