= Arzoxifene =

Chemical compound

Clinical data
- Other names: LY-353381
- Routes of administration: By mouth
- Drug class: Selective estrogen receptor modulator

Identifiers
- IUPAC name: 2-(4-Methoxyphenyl)-3-[4-(2-piperidin-1-ylethoxy)phenoxy]-1-benzothiophen-6-ol
- CAS Number: 182133-25-1 182133-27-3 (hydrochloride)
- PubChem CID: 179337
- ChemSpider: 156104
- UNII: E569WG6E60
- KEGG: D02993
- ChEMBL: ChEMBL226267
- CompTox Dashboard (EPA): DTXSID10171255

Chemical and physical data
- Formula: C_{28}H_{29}NO_{4}S
- Molar mass: 475.60 g·mol^{−1}
- 3D model (JSmol): Interactive image
- SMILES: COC1=CC=C(C=C1)C2=C(C3=C(S2)C=C(C=C3)O)OC4=CC=C(C=C4)OCCN5CCCCC5
- InChI: InChI=1S/C28H29NO4S/c1-31-22-8-5-20(6-9-22)28-27(25-14-7-21(30)19-26(25)34-28)33-24-12-10-23(11-13-24)32-18-17-29-15-3-2-4-16-29/h5-14,19,30H,2-4,15-18H2,1H3; Key:MCGDSOGUHLTADD-UHFFFAOYSA-N

Arzoxifene (INN; developmental code name LY-353381) is a selective estrogen receptor modulator (SERM) of the benzothiophene group which was never marketed. It is a potent estrogen antagonist in mammary and uterine tissue while acting as an estrogen agonist to maintain bone density and lower serum cholesterol. Arzoxifene is a highly effective agent for prevention of mammary cancer induced in the rat by the carcinogen nitrosomethylurea and is significantly more potent than raloxifene in this regard. Arzoxifene is devoid of the uterotrophic effects of tamoxifen, suggesting that, in contrast to tamoxifen, it is unlikely that the clinical use of arzoxifene will increase the risk of developing endometrial carcinoma.

== Pharmacology ==
Arzoxifene is a selective estrogen receptor modulator (SERM), and hence is a mixed agonist and antagonist of the estrogen receptor with tissue-selective estrogenic and antiestrogenic activity. It has antiestrogenic effects in the breast, mixed estrogenic and antiestrogenic effects in the uterus, and estrogenic effects in bone. The medication has been found to suppress gonadotropin levels in postmenopausal women, increase sex hormone-binding globulin levels, and decrease insulin-like growth factor 1 and insulin-like growth factor-binding protein 3 levels.

== Research ==
In a phase 3 clinical study in postmenopausal women, arzoxifene was shown to increase bone spine and hip mineral density and had no effect on the uterus and endometrium.

Lilly announced in August 2009 that preliminary results from a five-year clinical study showed that arzoxifene met its primary endpoints of reduction in vertebral fractures and breast cancer in postmenopausal women. However arzoxifene failed to meet secondary endpoints of reduction in non-vertebral fractures and cardiovascular events and improvements in cognitive function. Based on these results, Lilly announced they are discontinuing further development of the drug and would not seek regulatory approval.

A 2015 network meta-analysis found that arzoxifene significantly reduced the risk of breast cancer (RR = 0.415) and to a greater extent than raloxifene (RR = 0.572) or tamoxifen (RR = 0.708).
