= Triphenylethylene =

Names
- IUPAC name 1,1',1''-(Ethene-1,1,2-triyl)tribenzene

Identifiers
CAS Number	58-72-0
3D model (JSmol)	Interactive image
ChEBI	CHEBI:35034
ChEMBL	ChEMBL3115201
ChemSpider	5803
ECHA InfoCard	100.000.359
EC Number	200-395-1
KEGG	14134
PubChem CID	6025
UNII	S4ZLZ1K74B
CompTox Dashboard (EPA)	DTXSID3022320
- InChI: InChI=1S/C20H16/c1-4-10-17(11-5-1)16-20(18-12-6-2-7-13-18)19-14-8-3-9-15-19/h1-16H Key: MKYQPGPNVYRMHI-UHFFFAOYSA-N
- SMILES: C1=CC=C(C=C1)C=C(C2=CC=CC=C2)C3=CC=CC=C3

Properties
Chemical formula	C_{20}H_{16}
Molar mass	256.348 g·mol^{−1}
Appearance	white solid
Density	1.163 g/cm^{3}
Melting point	65–67.5 °C (149.0–153.5 °F; 338.1–340.6 K)

Hazards
- GHS labelling
Pictograms	(GHS07: Exclamation mark) (GHS09: Environmental hazard)
Signal word	Warning
Hazard statements	H302, H319, H410
Precautionary statements	P264, P264+P265, P270, P273, P280, P301+P317, P305+P351+P338, P330, P337+P317, P391, P501
- Except where otherwise noted, data are given for materials in their standard state (at 25 °C [77 °F], 100 kPa). Infobox references

Triphenylethylene (TPE) is the organic compound with the formula (C_{6}H_{5})_{2}C=CH(C_{6}H_{5}). It is a colorless solid.

== Synthesis and reactions ==
The compound is prepared in two steps from benzophenone via the intermediacy of 1,2,2-triphenylethanol. Triphenylethylene reacts with iodine to give 9-phenylphenanthroline. Epoxidation gives the chiral oxirane.

== Bioactivity ==
Triphenylethylene possesses weak estrogenic activity. Its estrogenic effects were discovered in 1937. TPE was derived from structural modification of the more potent estrogen diethylstilbestrol, which is a member of the stilbestrol group of nonsteroidal estrogens.

TPE is the parent compound of a group of nonsteroidal estrogen receptor ligands. It includes the estrogens chlorotrianisene, desmethylchlorotrianisene, estrobin (DBE), M2613, triphenylbromoethylene, triphenylchloroethylene, triphenyliodoethylene, triphenylmethylethylene; the selective estrogen receptor modulators (SERMs) afimoxifene, brilanestrant, broparestrol, clomifene, clomifenoxide, droloxifene, endoxifen, etacstil, fispemifene, idoxifene, miproxifene, miproxifene phosphate, nafoxidine, ospemifene, panomifene, and toremifene. The antiestrogen ethamoxytriphetol (MER-25) is also closely related, but is technically not a derivative of TPE and is instead a triphenylethanol derivative. The tamoxifen metabolite and aromatase inhibitor norendoxifen is also a TPE derivative. In addition to their estrogenic activity, various TPE derivatives like tamoxifen and clomifene have been found to act as protein kinase C inhibitors.

The affinity of triphenylethylene for the rat estrogen receptor is about 0.002% relative to estradiol. For comparison, the relative binding affinities of derivatives of triphenylethylene were 1.6% for tamoxifen, 175% for afimoxifene (4-hydroxytamoxifen), 15% for droloxifene, 1.4% for toremifene (4-chlorotamoxifen), 0.72% for clomifene, and 0.72% for nafoxidine.

== See also ==
- List of selective estrogen receptor modulators
