= Afimoxifene =

Chemical compound

Clinical data
- Trade names: TamoGel
- Other names: 4-Hydroxytamoxifen; 4-OHT; 4-HT; OHTAM; TamoGel
- Routes of administration: Topical (gel)

Identifiers
- IUPAC name: (Z)-4-(1-(4-(2-(dimethylamino)ethoxy)phenyl)-2-phenylbut-1-enyl)phenol
- CAS Number: 68392-35-8
- PubChem CID: 449459
- ChemSpider: 395987
- UNII: 17197F0KYM
- KEGG: D06551
- ChEBI: CHEBI:44616
- ChEMBL: ChEMBL489
- CompTox Dashboard (EPA): DTXSID7022384
- ECHA InfoCard: 100.163.120

Chemical and physical data
- Formula: C_{26}H_{29}NO_{2}
- Molar mass: 387.523 g·mol^{−1}
- 3D model (JSmol): Interactive image
- SMILES: CC\C(c1ccccc1)=C(c2ccc(OCCN(C)C)cc2)/c3ccc(O)cc3
- InChI: InChI=1S/C26H29NO2/c1-4-25(20-8-6-5-7-9-20)26(21-10-14-23(28)15-11-21)22-12-16-24(17-13-22)29-19-18-27(2)3/h5-17,28H,4,18-19H2,1-3H3/b26-25-; Key:TXUZVZSFRXZGTL-QPLCGJKRSA-N

Afimoxifene, also known as 4-hydroxytamoxifen (4-OHT) and by its tentative brand name TamoGel, is a selective estrogen receptor modulator (SERM) of the triphenylethylene group and an active metabolite of tamoxifen. The drug is under development under the tentative brand name TamoGel as a topical gel for the treatment of hyperplasia of the breast. It has completed a phase II clinical trial for cyclical mastalgia, but further studies are required before afimoxifene can be approved for this indication and marketed.

Afimoxifene is a SERM and hence acts as a tissue-selective agonist–antagonist of the estrogen receptors ERα and ERβ with mixed estrogenic and antiestrogenic activity depending on the tissue. It is also an agonist of the G protein-coupled estrogen receptor (GPER) with relatively low affinity (100–1,000 nM, relative to 3–6 nM for estradiol). In addition to its estrogenic and antiestrogenic activity, afimoxifene has been found to act as an antagonist of the estrogen-related receptors (ERRs) ERRβ and ERRγ.

== See also ==
- List of investigational sex-hormonal agents § Estrogenics
- List of selective estrogen receptor modulators
