= Allenestrol =

Chemical compound

Clinical data
- Other names: Allenestril; Allenoestril; α,α-Dimethyl-β-ethylallenolic acid; Dimethylethylallenolic acid; Methallenestrilphenol; Methallenestrolphenol

Identifiers
- IUPAC name: 3-(6-Hydroxynaphthalen-2-yl)-2,2-dimethylpentanoic acid
- CAS Number: 15372-37-9
- PubChem CID: 254232
- ChemSpider: 222838
- UNII: 6J0J47Q1NX
- KEGG: C14719
- ChEBI: CHEBI:34865
- ChEMBL: ChEMBL1978410
- CompTox Dashboard (EPA): DTXSID40860807

Chemical and physical data
- Formula: C_{17}H_{20}O_{3}
- Molar mass: 272.344 g·mol^{−1}
- 3D model (JSmol): Interactive image
- SMILES: CCC(C1=CC2=C(C=C1)C=C(C=C2)O)C(C)(C)C(=O)O
- InChI: InChI=1S/C17H20O3/c1-4-15(17(2,3)16(19)20)13-6-5-12-10-14(18)8-7-11(12)9-13/h5-10,15,18H,4H2,1-3H3,(H,19,20); Key:OKLBSPJQRWHBMY-UHFFFAOYSA-N

Allenestrol, or allenoestrol, also known as α,α-dimethyl-β-ethylallenolic acid or as methallenestrilphenol, is a synthetic, nonsteroidal estrogen and a derivative of allenolic acid that was never marketed. A methyl ether of allenestrol, methallenestril (methallenestrol), is also an estrogen, but, in contrast to allenestrol, has been marketed.

== See also ==
- Carbestrol
- Bisdehydrodoisynolic acid
- Doisynolic acid
- Doisynoestrol
- Fenestrel
