= Triphenylmethylethylene =

Chemical compound

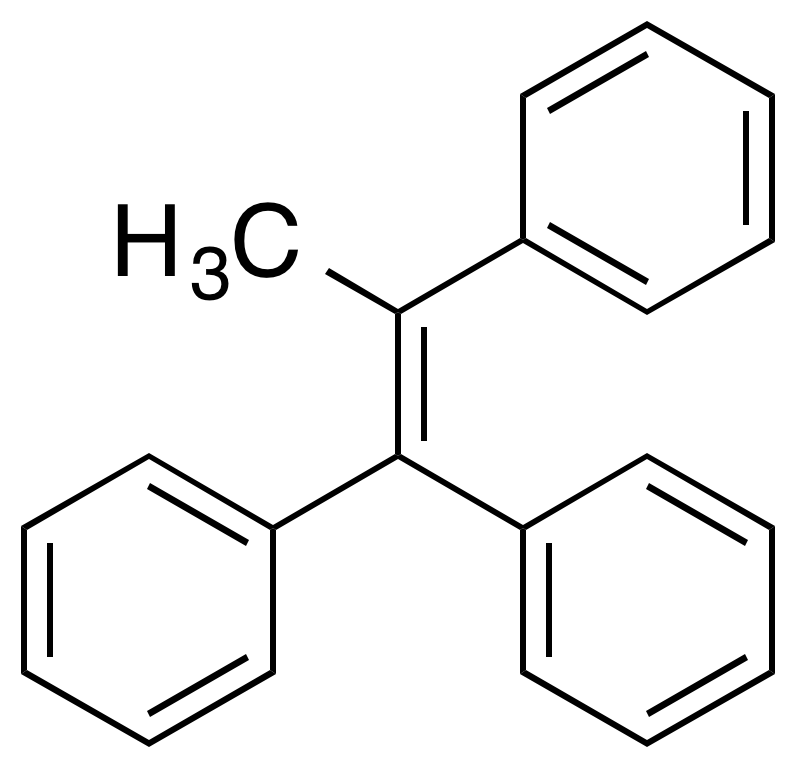

Clinical data
- Other names: Methyltriphenylethylene; Triphenylpropene
- Drug class: Nonsteroidal estrogen

Identifiers
- IUPAC name: 1,1-diphenylprop-1-en-2-ylbenzene
- CAS Number: 3677-70-1
- PubChem CID: 4207747
- ChemSpider: 3417659
- UNII: 92DB2Q7TH8
- CompTox Dashboard (EPA): DTXSID601337056

Chemical and physical data
- Formula: C_{21}H_{18}
- Molar mass: 270.375 g·mol^{−1}
- 3D model (JSmol): Interactive image
- SMILES: CC(=C(C1=CC=CC=C1)C2=CC=CC=C2)C3=CC=CC=C3
- InChI: InChI=1S/C21H18/c1-17(18-11-5-2-6-12-18)21(19-13-7-3-8-14-19)20-15-9-4-10-16-20/h2-16H,1H3; Key:FLTIZNYOOOPPHQ-UHFFFAOYSA-N

Triphenylmethylethylene, also known as methyltriphenylethylene or as triphenylpropene, is a synthetic nonsteroidal estrogen of the triphenylethylene group that is related to triphenylchloroethylene and was never marketed. Along with diethylstilbestrol and triphenylchoroethylene, triphenylmethylethylene was studied in 1944 by Sir Alexander Haddow for the treatment of breast cancer, and this is historically notable in that it was the first time that high-dose estrogens were found to be effective in the treatment of breast cancer. However, while diethylstilbestrol and triphenylchloroethylene were found to be significantly effective, triphenylmethylethylene was less effective and showed a favorable response in only 1 of 4 treated cases.

== See also ==
- Triphenylbromoethylene
- Triphenyliodoethylene
