= Secosteroid =

Class of chemicals derived from steroids

Cholecalciferol, an example of a 9,10-secosteroid. IUPAC-approved carbon numbering and ring labeling is shown in the picture. Since secosteroids are derived from steroids, they retain the same labeling system as steroids.

The parent steroid skeleton. The B-ring of the parent steroid is broken between C9 and C10 to yield D vitamins.

A secosteroid (/ˈsɛkoʊˌstɛrɔɪd/) is a type of steroid with a "broken" ring. The word secosteroid derives from the Latin verb secare meaning "to cut", and 'steroid'. Secosteroids are described as a subclass of steroids under the IUPAC nomenclature. Some sources instead describe them as compounds derived from steroids.

Types or subclasses of secosteroids are defined by the carbon atoms of the parent steroid skeleton where the ring cleavage has taken place. For example, 9,10-secosteroids are derived from cleavage of the bond between carbon atoms C9 and C10 of the steroid B-ring (similarly 5,6-secosteroids, 13,14-secosteroids, etc.).

The prototypical secosteroid is cholecalciferol (vitamin D_{3}). Its IUPAC systematic is "(5Z,7E)-(3S)-9,10-secocholestra-5,7,10(19)-trien-3-ol".

Some nonsteroidal estrogens, like doisynolic acid (cleaved on the D ring) and allenolic acid, are also secosteroids or secosteroid-like compounds.

== See also ==
- Secoergoline
