= 2-Methoxynaphthalene =

Names
- Preferred IUPAC name 2-Methoxynaphthalene
- Other names Methyl naphthalen-2-yl ether Methyl 2-naphthyl ether 2-Naphthol methyl ether 2-Naphthyl methyl ether β-Methoxynaphthalene β-Methyl naphthyl ether β-Naphthol methyl ether Nerolin; Yara yara

Identifiers
CAS Number	93-04-9
3D model (JSmol)	Interactive image
ChemSpider	6852
ECHA InfoCard	100.002.013
PubChem CID	7119
UNII	VX2T1Z50C4
CompTox Dashboard (EPA)	DTXSID7044392
- InChI: InChI=1S/C11H10O/c1-12-11-7-6-9-4-2-3-5-10(9)8-11/h2-8H,1H3 Key: LUZDYPLAQQGJEA-UHFFFAOYSA-N; InChI=1/C11H10O/c1-12-11-7-6-9-4-2-3-5-10(9)8-11/h2-8H,1H3 Key: LUZDYPLAQQGJEA-UHFFFAOYAR
- SMILES: O(c2ccc1c(cccc1)c2)C

Properties
Chemical formula	C_{11}H_{10}O
Molar mass	158.200 g·mol^{−1}
Melting point	73–75 °C (163–167 °F; 346–348 K)
Boiling point	274 °C (525 °F; 547 K)
- Except where otherwise noted, data are given for materials in their standard state (at 25 °C [77 °F], 100 kPa). Infobox references

2-Methoxynaphthalene, also called β-naphthol methyl ether, nerolin, or yara yara, is a stabilizer found in gunpowder, particularly smokeless gunpowders. It is soluble in alcohol, and insoluble in water and dipropylene glycol.

Studies have also been done on the antiinflammatory effect of β-naphthol methyl ether and on how it behaves in time-resolved resonance Raman studies.

== Synthesis and uses ==
Nerolin can be prepared by alkylation of β-naphthol with dimethyl sulfate.

Alternative syntheses rely on the reaction of 2-Naphthol with iodomethane and KOH (Williamson ether synthesis), or by the reaction with methanol in concentrated sulfuric acid solution.

It has a faint but persistent odor and used to be a scented compound found in soap and other products.

== Applications ==
The Friedel–Crafts acylation with propionyl chloride gives 2-propionyl-6-methoxynaphthalene (Promen) [2700-47-2]. This compound has known uses in the synthesis of Doisynoestrol & Methallenestril.

Acetylation gives 2-Acetyl-6-methoxynaphthalene, which has historical use in the synthesis of Naproxen.

Nerolin had found use in the synthesis of 6-Methoxy-1-tetralone [1078-19-9], which is a critical compound for manifold reasons.
