= Doisynolic acid =

Chemical compound

Clinical data
- ATC code: None

Identifiers
- IUPAC name: 1-Ethyl-7-hydroxy-2-methyl-3,4,4a,9,10,10a-hexahydro-1H-phenanthrene-2-carboxylic acid
- CAS Number: 482-49-5
- PubChem CID: 101706
- ChemSpider: 91894
- UNII: CBJ6A3D19C
- CompTox Dashboard (EPA): DTXSID50964027 DTXSID20275970, DTXSID50964027

Chemical and physical data
- Formula: C_{18}H_{24}O_{3}
- Molar mass: 288.387 g·mol^{−1}
- 3D model (JSmol): Interactive image
- SMILES: CCC1C2CCC3=C(C2CCC1(C)C(=O)O)C=CC(=C3)O
- InChI: InChI=1S/C18H24O3/c1-3-16-15-6-4-11-10-12(19)5-7-13(11)14(15)8-9-18(16,2)17(20)21/h5,7,10,14-16,19H,3-4,6,8-9H2,1-2H3,(H,20,21); Key:GEGYYIFBFKSCPK-UHFFFAOYSA-N

Doisynolic acid is a synthetic, orally active, nonsteroidal estrogen that was never marketed. The reaction of estradiol or estrone with potassium hydroxide, a strong base, results in doisynolic acid as a degradation product, which retains high estrogenic activity, and this reaction was how the drug was discovered, in the late 1930s. The drug is a highly active and potent estrogen by the oral or subcutaneous route. The reaction of equilenin or dihydroequilenin with potassium hydroxide was also found to produce bisdehydrodoisynolic acid, whose levorotatory isomer is an estrogen with an "astonishingly" high degree of potency, while the dextrorotatory isomer is inactive. Doisynolic acid was named after Edward Adelbert Doisy, a pioneer in the field of estrogen research and one of the discoverers of estrone.

Doisynolic acid is the parent compound of a group of synthetic, nonsteroidal estrogens with high oral activity. The synthetic, nonsteroidal estrogens methallenestril, fenestrel, and carbestrol were all derived from doisynolic acid and are seco-analogues of the compound. Doisynoestrol, also known as fenocycline, is cis-bisdehydrdoisynolic acid methyl ether, and is another estrogenic derivative.

== See also ==
- Allenolic acid
- Diethylstilbestrol
- Stilbestrol
- Chlorotrianisene
- Triphenylethylene
