= Diethylstilbestrol monobenzyl ether =

Chemical compound

Clinical data
- Trade names: Monozol, Hypantin, Pituitrope
- Other names: Benzelstilbestrol
- Drug class: Nonsteroidal estrogen; Estrogen ether

Identifiers
- IUPAC name: 4-[(E)-4-(4-phenylmethoxyphenyl)hex-3-en-3-yl]phenol
- CAS Number: 6202-26-2
- PubChem CID: 3036244
- ChemSpider: 2300304
- UNII: DWY5LU966C
- CompTox Dashboard (EPA): DTXSID701046848

Chemical and physical data
- Formula: C_{25}H_{26}O_{2}
- Molar mass: 358.481 g·mol^{−1}
- 3D model (JSmol): Interactive image
- SMILES: CC/C(=C(/CC)\C1=CC=C(C=C1)OCC2=CC=CC=C2)/C3=CC=C(C=C3)O
- InChI: InChI=1S/C25H26O2/c1-3-24(20-10-14-22(26)15-11-20)25(4-2)21-12-16-23(17-13-21)27-18-19-8-6-5-7-9-19/h5-17,26H,3-4,18H2,1-2H3/b25-24+; Key:FVLDPSZNPFWQQP-OCOZRVBESA-N

Diethylstilbestrol monobenzyl ether (brand names Monozol, Hypantin, Pituitrope), also known as benzelstilbestrol, is a synthetic, nonsteroidal estrogen of the stilbestrol group and an ether of diethylstilbestrol (DES) that is described as a pituitary gland inhibitor (antigonadotropin) and was formerly marketed but is now no longer available. It was first synthesized by Wallace & Tiernan Company in 1952, and was described by them as having only weak estrogenic activity. The drug was used to treat gynecological conditions and infertility in women.

== See also ==
- List of estrogen esters § Ethers of nonsteroidal estrogens
