= SC-4289 =

Chemical compound

Clinical data
- Other names: 6-[1'-Ethyl-2',2'-dimethyl-3'-hydroxy]propyl-β-naphthol-2-benzyl ether
- Routes of administration: By mouth
- Drug class: Nonsteroidal estrogen

Identifiers
- IUPAC name: 2,2-Dimethyl-3-(6'-benzyloxy-2'-naphthyl)pentanol
- CAS Number: 96668-66-5
- PubChem CID: 154132848

Chemical and physical data
- Formula: C_{24}H_{28}O_{2}
- Molar mass: 348.486 g·mol^{−1}
- 3D model (JSmol): Interactive image
- SMILES: CCC(C1=CC=C2C=C(OCC3=CC=CC=C3)C=CC2=C1)C(C)(C)CO
- InChI: InChI=1S/C24H28O2/c1-4-23(24(2,3)17-25)21-11-10-20-15-22(13-12-19(20)14-21)26-16-18-8-6-5-7-9-18/h5-15,23,25H,4,16-17H2,1-3H3; Key:FRDCVULRLQYMDS-UHFFFAOYSA-N

SC-4289 is a synthetic nonsteroidal estrogen which, along with mytatrienediol (SC-6924; Manvene, Anvene), was developed in the late 1950s as a potential treatment for atherosclerosis in men but was never marketed.

The chemical structure of SC-4289 is the same as for methallenestril but differs in that it is the benzyl ether and not the methyl ether.

SC-4289 makes an appearance in the allenestrol patent, as well as a stand-alone compound in:
