= C19H22O2 =

The molecular formula C_{19}H_{22}O_{2} (molar mass: 282.38 g/mol) may refer to:

- 1,4,6-Androstatrien-3,17-dione
- Cannabivarin
- Dianethole
- Dimesityldioxirane
- Mestilbol
- Miltirone
- Vedaprofen
- 17β-Methyl-17α-dihydroequilenin
