= WAY-204688 =

Chemical compound

Clinical data
- Drug class: Nonsteroidal estrogen; Nuclear factor κB inhibitor

Identifiers
- IUPAC name: (2S)-2-[(S)-(2-methoxyphenyl)naphthalen-1-ylmethyl]-2-methyl-3-oxo-3-[4-[3-(trifluoromethyl)phenyl]piperidin-1-yl]propanenitrile
- CAS Number: 796854-35-8
- PubChem CID: 9829162
- ChemSpider: 28655006
- UNII: QT9VF4MW6U
- ChEMBL: ChEMBL238890

Chemical and physical data
- Formula: C_{34}H_{31}F_{3}N_{2}O_{2}
- Molar mass: 556.629 g·mol^{−1}
- 3D model (JSmol): Interactive image
- SMILES: C[C@@](C#N)([C@H](C1=CC=CC=C1OC)C2=CC=CC3=CC=CC=C32)C(=O)N4CCC(CC4)C5=CC(=CC=C5)C(F)(F)F
- InChI: InChI=1S/C34H31F3N2O2/c1-33(22-38,32(40)39-19-17-23(18-20-39)25-11-7-12-26(21-25)34(35,36)37)31(29-14-5-6-16-30(29)41-2)28-15-8-10-24-9-3-4-13-27(24)28/h3-16,21,23,31H,17-20H2,1-2H3/t31-,33+/m0/s1; Key:JZPONCMNBSEYQW-CQTOTRCISA-N

WAY-204688, also known as SIM-688, is a synthetic nonsteroidal estrogen and nuclear factor κB (NF-κB) inhibitor which was originated by ArQule and Wyeth and was under development by Wyeth for the treatment of rheumatoid arthritis, non-specific inflammation, and sepsis but was never marketed. It is a "pathway-selective" estrogen receptor (ER) ligand which inhibits NF-κB with an IC_{50} of 122 nM and with maximal inhibition relative to estradiol of 94%. Inhibition of NF-κB by WAY-204688 appears to be dependent on agonism of the ERα, as it is reversed by the ERα antagonist fulvestrant, but is not dependent on the ERβ. In contrast to the case of NF-κB inhibition, WAY-204688 produces only slight elevation of creatine kinase in vitro, a measure of classical estradiol effects. It reached phase I clinical trials prior to the discontinuation of its development.
