= C28H38O4 =

The molecular formula C_{28}H_{38}O_{4} (molar mass: 438.599 g/mol, exact mass: 438.2770 u) may refer to:

- Anordrin
- Methenmadinone caproate (MMC)
