= Triphenylchloroethylene =

Pharmaceutical drug

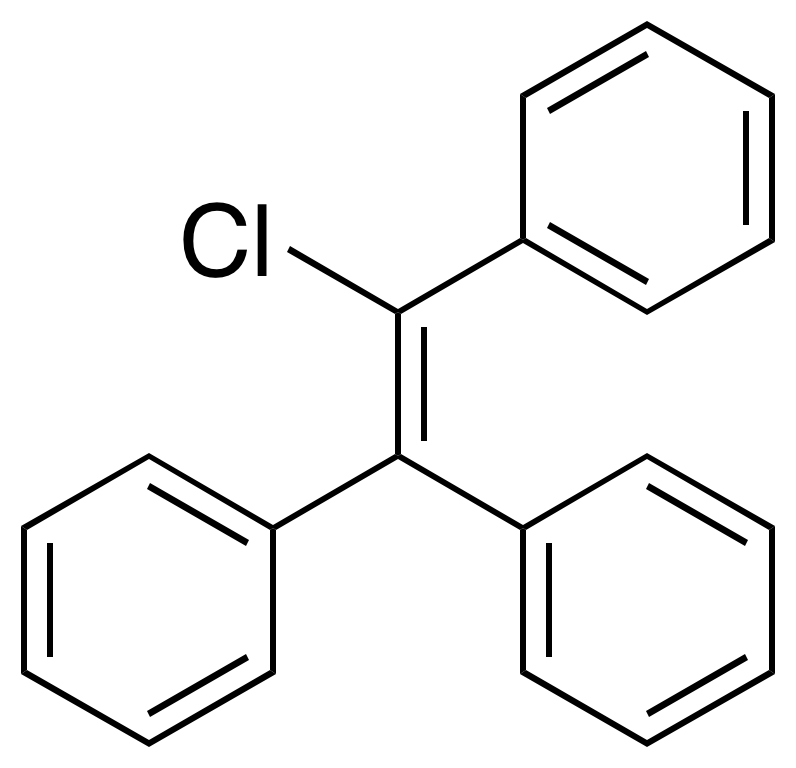

Clinical data
- Trade names: Gynosone, Oestrogyl
- Other names: TPCE; Triphenylchlorethylene; Chlorotriphenylethylene; Phenylstilbene chloride
- Drug class: Nonsteroidal estrogen

Identifiers
- IUPAC name: (1-chloro-2,2-diphenylethenyl)benzene
- CAS Number: 18084-97-4
- PubChem CID: 87450
- ChemSpider: 78884
- UNII: AV6NM693EG
- CompTox Dashboard (EPA): DTXSID80171020

Chemical and physical data
- Formula: C_{20}H_{15}Cl
- Molar mass: 290.79 g·mol^{−1}
- 3D model (JSmol): Interactive image
- SMILES: C1=CC=C(C=C1)C(=C(C2=CC=CC=C2)Cl)C3=CC=CC=C3
- InChI: InChI=1S/C20H15Cl/c21-20(18-14-8-3-9-15-18)19(16-10-4-1-5-11-16)17-12-6-2-7-13-17/h1-15H; Key:QEQFTTCZLHLKFX-UHFFFAOYSA-N

Triphenylchloroethylene (TPCE; brand names Gynosone, Oestrogyl), or triphenylchlorethylene, also known as chlorotriphenylethylene or as phenylstilbene chloride, is a synthetic nonsteroidal estrogen of the triphenylethylene group that was marketed in the 1940s for the treatment of menopausal symptoms, vaginal atrophy, lactation suppression, and all other estrogen-indicated conditions.

The estrogenic effects of triphenylethylene, the parent compound of triphenylchloroethylene, were discovered in 1937. Triphenylchloroethylene was first reported in 1938 and was found to have 20 to 100 times the estrogenic activity of the relatively weak triphenylethylene, a potentiation of effect that was afforded by its halogen substituent. The drug has a relatively long duration of action when administered via subcutaneous injection but a duration similar to that of diethylstilbestrol or estradiol benzoate when administered orally. Along with diethylstilbestrol and triphenylmethylethylene, triphenylchloroethylene was studied in 1944 by Sir Alexander Haddow for the treatment of breast cancer and was found to be significantly effective, and this is historically notable in that it was the first time that high-dose estrogens were found to be effective in the treatment of breast cancer.

== SAR analogs ==
Chlorotrianisene, or tri-p-anisylchloroethylene (TACE), is a potent marketed estrogen and a derivative of triphenylchloroethylene in which each of the three phenyl rings has been substituted with a 4-methoxy group. Estrobin, or DBE, is a related, never-marketed estrogen in which there is a bromine in place of the chlorine and two of the three phenyl rings have ethoxy groups. Broparestrol, or BDPE is a marketed selective estrogen receptor modulator (SERM) that has a bromine in place of the chlorine of triphenylchloroethylene and a 4-ethyl group on one of the phenyl rings. The SERM clomifene is also a derivative of triphenylchloroethylene.

== Synthesis ==
The chemical synthesis has been described. The Grignard reaction of benzylmagnesium bromide on benzophenone (or the action of phenylmagnesium bromide on desoxybenzoin or ethyl phenylacetate or chloroacetyl chloride etc.) give a carbinol which is dehydrated to the stilbene (i.e. triphenylethylene). Halogenation with chlorine in e.g. CCl4 solvent (c.f. TACE) then yields the product.

== See also ==
- Triphenylbromoethylene
- Triphenyliodoethylene

Although the vinylic halogens has already been considered, it was discovered that Triphenylacrylonitrile [6304-33-2] also potently modulates the estrogen receptor.
