= Methestrol dipropionate =

Chemical compound

Clinical data
- Trade names: Meprane Dipropionate
- Other names: Methoestrol dipropionate; Metestrol dipropionate; Promethestrol dipropionate; Promethoestrol dipropionate; Dimethylhexestrol dipropionate
- Drug class: Nonsteroidal estrogen; Estrogen ester

Identifiers
- IUPAC name: [2-methyl-4-[4-(3-methyl-4-propanoyloxyphenyl)hexan-3-yl]phenyl] propanoate
- CAS Number: 130-73-4
- PubChem CID: 6765
- ChemSpider: 6507
- UNII: 199O25Z2BQ
- CompTox Dashboard (EPA): DTXSID701016740

Chemical and physical data
- Formula: C_{26}H_{34}O_{4}
- Molar mass: 410.554 g·mol^{−1}
- 3D model (JSmol): Interactive image
- SMILES: CCC(C1=CC(=C(C=C1)OC(=O)CC)C)C(CC)C2=CC(=C(C=C2)OC(=O)CC)C
- InChI: InChI=1S/C26H34O4/c1-7-21(19-11-13-23(17(5)15-19)29-25(27)9-3)22(8-2)20-12-14-24(18(6)16-20)30-26(28)10-4/h11-16,21-22H,7-10H2,1-6H3; Key:ORHVFDBDWJTZIN-UHFFFAOYSA-N

Methestrol dipropionate (also known as methoestrol dipropionate, promethestrol dipropionate, promethoestrol dipropionate, or dimethylhexestrol dipropionate; brand name Meprane Dipropionate) is a synthetic nonsteroidal estrogen of the stilbestrol group related to diethylstilbestrol that is or was used clinically. It is the dipropionate form of methestrol (or promethestrol), which, in contrast to methestrol dipropionate, was never marketed.

== See also ==
- Benzestrol
- Dienestrol
- Fosfestrol
- Hexestrol
