= Clomestrone =

Chemical compound

Clinical data
- Trade names: Arterolo, Atheran, Colesterel, Iposclerone, Liprotene, Persclerol
- Other names: SC-8246; 16α-Chloroestrone 3-methyl ether; 16α-Chloro-3-methoxyestra-1,3,5(10)-trien-17-one
- Routes of administration: By mouth
- Drug class: Estrogen; Estrogen ether

Identifiers
- IUPAC name: (8R,9S,13S,14S,16R)-16-chloro-3-methoxy-13-methyl-7,8,9,11,12,14,15,16-octahydro-6H-cyclopenta[a]phenanthren-17-one
- CAS Number: 4091-75-2
- PubChem CID: 107501
- ChemSpider: 96732
- UNII: P1L5F7667L
- CompTox Dashboard (EPA): DTXSID50878418
- ECHA InfoCard: 100.021.669

Chemical and physical data
- Formula: C_{19}H_{23}ClO_{2}
- Molar mass: 318.84 g·mol^{−1}
- 3D model (JSmol): Interactive image
- SMILES: CC12CCC3C(C1CC(C2=O)Cl)CCC4=C3C=CC(=C4)OC
- InChI: InChI=1S/C19H23ClO2/c1-19-8-7-14-13-6-4-12(22-2)9-11(13)3-5-15(14)16(19)10-17(20)18(19)21/h4,6,9,14-17H,3,5,7-8,10H2,1-2H3/t14-,15-,16+,17-,19+/m1/s1; Key:UQIPVSBPFZSWGD-ILYVXUQDSA-N

Clomestrone (brand names Arterolo, Atheran, Colesterel, Iposclerone, Liprotene, Persclerol, and others; developmental code SC-8246; also known as 16α-chloroestrone 3-methyl ether) is a synthetic, steroidal, weak estrogen derived from estrone and used as an anticholesterolemic agent in the treatment of atherosclerosis.

It is said to have beneficial effects on serum lipid profiles while producing minimal feminization, though some estrogenic side effects, including breast tenderness, loss of libido, and fatigue or avolition, were observed in most patients in clinical studies. The drug is a close analogue of mytatrienediol, and the two estrogens have similar drug profiles. Clomestrone was described in the literature in 1958 and introduced for medical use shortly thereafter.

== See also ==
- List of estrogens § Ethers of steroidal estrogens
- Triparanol
