= Bisdehydrodoisynolic acid =

Chemical compound

Identifiers
- IUPAC name: 1-Ethyl-7-hydroxy-2-methyl-1,2,3,4-tetrahydrophenanthrene-2-carboxylic acid
- CAS Number: 5684-12-8
- PubChem CID: 21354867
- ChemSpider: 8215090
- UNII: L7N8HRK49S

Chemical and physical data
- Formula: C_{18}H_{20}O_{3}
- Molar mass: 284.355 g·mol^{−1}
- 3D model (JSmol): Interactive image
- SMILES: CCC1C2=C(CCC1(C)C(O)=O)C1=CC=C(O)C=C1C=C2
- InChI: InChI=1/C18H20O3/c1-3-16-15-6-4-11-10-12(19)5-7-13(11)14(15)8-9-18(16,2)17(20)21/h4-7,10,16,19H,3,8-9H2,1-2H3,(H,20,21); Key:HMYBVYBHZVQZNH-UHFFFAOYNA-N

Bisdehydrodoisynolic acid (BDDA), as the (Z)-isomer ((Z)-BDDA), is a synthetic, nonsteroidal estrogen related to doisynolic acid that was never marketed. It is one of the most potent estrogens known, although it has more recently been characterized as a selective estrogen receptor modulator (SERM). BDDA and other doisynolic acid derivatives display relatively low affinity accompanied by disproportionately high estrogenic potency in vivo, which was eventually determined to be due to transformation into metabolites with greater estrogenic activity. The drug was discovered in 1947 as a degradation product of the reaction of equilenin or dihydroequilenin with potassium hydroxide. It is the seco-analogue of equilenin, while doisynolic acid is the seco-analogue of estrone. These compounds, along with diethylstilbestrol, can be considered to be open-ring analogues of estradiol. The methyl ether of BDDA, doisynoestrol, is also an estrogen, and in contrast to BDDA, has been marketed.

== See also ==
- Allenolic acid
- Carbestrol
- Fenestrel
- Methallenestril
- Stilbestrol
- Triphenylethylene
