= C22H30O2 =

The molecular formula C_{22}H_{30}O_{2} (molar mass: 326.48 g/mol, exact mass: 326.2246 u) may refer to:

- Anordiol, or anordriol
- Promegestone
