= C26H34O4 =

The molecular formula C_{26}H_{34}O_{4} (molar mass: 410.55 g/mol, exact mass: 410.2457 u) may refer to:

- CP 42,096
- Methestrol dipropionate
- Trenbolone hexahydrobenzylcarbonate, or trenbolone cyclohexylmethylcarbonate
