= Werner Emmanuel Bachmann =

American chemist (1901–1951)

- Born: November 13, 1901; Detroit, Michigan, US
- Died: March 22, 1951 (aged 49)
- Education: Wayne State University; University of Michigan (B.S., 1923)(M.S., 1924) (Ph.D, 1926)
- Awards: Henry Russell Award (1933); Naval Ordnance Award (1945); Presidential Certificate of Merit (1948); King's Medal
- Scientific career
- Fields: Chemistry; Physical organic chemistry
- Institutions: University of Michigan; University of Illinois

Werner Emmanuel Bachmann (November 13, 1901 – March 22, 1951) was an American chemist. Bachmann was born in Detroit, Michigan where he studied chemistry and chemical engineering at Wayne State University and later at the University of Michigan in Ann Arbor nearby. He completed his doctorate under Moses Gomberg and spent the rest of his academic career at the University of Michigan.

Bachmann studied physical organic chemistry (rearrangements, free radicals) and organic synthesis. He is considered a pioneer in steroid synthesis, and carried out the first total synthesis of a steroidal hormone, equilenin with Alfred L. Wilds. His name is associated with the Gomberg-Bachmann reaction for the synthesis of diaryl compounds from aryl diazonium chlorides.

Bachmann developed a new method for the production of the explosive RDX, which was used by the United States during World War II.

== Sources ==
- Elderfield, Robert C. (1951). "Werner Emmanuel Bachmann (1901-1951)" (PDF). Biographical Memoirs of the National Academy of Sciences.
- Michigan State University Bachmann Biography
- Gomberg-Bachmann reaction
