= Diethylstilbestrol diacetate =

Chemical compound

Clinical data
- Trade names: Hormostilboral Stark

Identifiers
- IUPAC name: (3E)-3-Hexene-3,4-diyldi-4,1-phenylene diacetate
- CAS Number: 5965-06-0
- ChemSpider: 2297470
- UNII: 4UU7RFG2SF

Chemical and physical data
- Formula: C_{22}H_{24}O_{4}
- Molar mass: 352.430 g·mol^{−1}
- 3D model (JSmol): Interactive image
- SMILES: CC\C(=C(\CC)C1=CC=C(OC(C)=O)C=C1)C1=CC=C(OC(C)=O)C=C1
- InChI: InChI=1S/C22H24O4/c1-5-21(17-7-11-19(12-8-17)25-15(3)23)22(6-2)18-9-13-20(14-10-18)26-16(4)24/h7-14H,5-6H2,1-4H3/b22-21+; Key:NFCAKXYIMSRNLP-QURGRASLSA-N

Diethylstilbestrol diacetate (DESDA) (brand name Hormostilboral Stark) is a synthetic, nonsteroidal estrogen of the stilbestrol group and an ester of diethylstilbestrol (DES) that was introduced for clinical use in the 1940s and was formerly marketed but is now no longer available.
