= Acefluranol =

Chemical compound

Clinical data
- Other names: BX-591; 2,3-Bis(3,4-diacetoxy-5-fluorophenyl)pentane
- Drug class: Antiestrogen

Identifiers
- IUPAC name: [2-acetyloxy-5-[3-(3,4-diacetyloxy-5-fluorophenyl)pentan-2-yl]-3-fluorophenyl] acetate
- CAS Number: 80595-73-9
- PubChem CID: 170368
- ChemSpider: 148965
- UNII: 3K0BN50QXD
- CompTox Dashboard (EPA): DTXSID90511453

Chemical and physical data
- Formula: C_{25}H_{26}F_{2}O_{8}
- Molar mass: 492.472 g·mol^{−1}
- 3D model (JSmol): Interactive image
- SMILES: CCC(C1=CC(=C(C(=C1)F)OC(=O)C)OC(=O)C)C(C)C2=CC(=C(C(=C2)F)OC(=O)C)OC(=O)C
- InChI: InChI=InChI=1S/C25H26F2O8/c1-7-19(18-9-21(27)25(35-16(6)31)23(11-18)33-14(4)29)12(2)17-8-20(26)24(34-15(5)30)22(10-17)32-13(3)28/h8-12,19H,7H2,1-6H3; Key:WSTGQGOLZDAWND-UHFFFAOYSA-N

Acefluranol (developmental code name BX-591), also known as 2,3-bis(3,4-diacetoxy-5-fluorophenyl)pentane, is a nonsteroidal antiestrogen of the stilbestrol group that was never marketed.

== See also ==
- Bifluranol
- Pentafluranol
- Terfluranol
