= Diethylstilbestrol dipalmitate =

Chemical compound

Clinical data
- Trade names: Palmestril, Stilpalmitate
- Other names: Stilpalmitate
- Routes of administration: Intramuscular injection

Identifiers
- IUPAC name: [4-[(E)-4-(4-Hexadecanoyloxyphenyl)hex-3-en-3-yl]phenyl] hexadecanoate
- CAS Number: 6533-53-5§§§§§≤≥
- PubChem CID: 3034511
- ChemSpider: 2298951
- UNII: 86291XW83U
- CompTox Dashboard (EPA): DTXSID401046837 DTXSID10983956, DTXSID401046837

Chemical and physical data
- Formula: C_{50}H_{80}O_{4}
- Molar mass: 745.186 g·mol^{−1}
- 3D model (JSmol): Interactive image
- SMILES: CCCCCCCCCCCCCCCC(=O)OC1=CC=C(C=C1)/C(=C(\CC)/C2=CC=C(C=C2)OC(=O)CCCCCCCCCCCCCCC)/CC
- InChI: InChI=1S/C50H80O4/c1-5-9-11-13-15-17-19-21-23-25-27-29-31-33-49(51)53-45-39-35-43(36-40-45)47(7-3)48(8-4)44-37-41-46(42-38-44)54-50(52)34-32-30-28-26-24-22-20-18-16-14-12-10-6-2/h35-42H,5-34H2,1-4H3/b48-47+; Key:JUHYOIKJCUMOSQ-QJGAVIKSSA-N

Diethylstilbestrol dipalmitate (brand names Palmestril, Stilpalmitate), also known as stilpalmitate, is a synthetic, nonsteroidal estrogen of the stilbestrol group and an ester of diethylstilbestrol (DES) that was formerly marketed but is now no longer available. Its actions and uses are essentially the same as those of DES, but it is absorbed more slowly and for this reason has a much longer duration of action and improved tolerability in comparison. A single 5 mg intramuscular injection of DES dipalmitate in oil solution has been found to have an average duration of action of 8 to 10 weeks in terms of relief of menopausal symptoms, with a duration of as long as 15 to 16 weeks occurring in some women. A single 15 or 20 mg intramuscular injection of DES dipalmitate in oil solution will control menopausal symptoms for 3 months or longer. DES dipalmitate in aqueous suspension by intramuscular injection has been studied as well.

== See also ==
- List of estrogen esters § Diethylstilbestrol esters
