= Desmethylchlorotrianisene =

Chemical compound

Clinical data
- Other names: DMCTA
- Drug class: Nonsteroidal estrogen

Identifiers
- IUPAC name: (EZ)-4-[2-Chloro-1,2-bis(4-hydroxyphenyl)ethenyl]phenol
- CAS Number: 80525-45-7 (E)-isomer: 80525-45-7 (Z)-isomer: 80525-44-6
- PubChem CID: 53325692
- ChemSpider: 25047392

Chemical and physical data
- Formula: C_{20}H_{15}ClO_{3}
- Molar mass: 338.79 g·mol^{−1}
- 3D model (JSmol): Interactive image
- SMILES: OC1=CC=C(/C(C2=CC=C(OC)C=C2)=C(Cl)/C3=CC=C(OC)C=C3)C=C1
- InChI: InChI=1S/C20H15ClO3/c21-20(15-5-11-18(24)12-6-15)19(13-1-7-16(22)8-2-13)14-3-9-17(23)10-4-14/h1-12,22-24H; Key:XQRLRQNJWROVPF-UHFFFAOYSA-N

Desmethylchlorotrianisene (DMCTA) is a nonsteroidal estrogen which is thought to be the major active metabolite of chlorotrianisene (CTA; TACE). It is a 1:1 mixture of cis and trans isomers. DMCTA is produced from CTA via mono-O-demethylation catalyzed by cytochrome P450 enzymes in the liver. CTA is thought to act as a long-lasting prodrug of DMCTA.
