= Furostilbestrol =

Chemical compound

Identifiers
- IUPAC name: 4-[(3E)-4-[4-(furan-2-carbonyloxy)phenyl]hex-3-en-3-yl]phenyl furan-2-carboxylate
- CAS Number: 549-40-6
- PubChem CID: 5930604
- ChemSpider: 4753142
- UNII: JN9M0YN4VL
- ChEMBL: ChEMBL2105117
- ECHA InfoCard: 100.008.151

Chemical and physical data
- Formula: C_{28}H_{24}O_{6}
- Molar mass: 456.494 g·mol^{−1}
- 3D model (JSmol): Interactive image
- SMILES: CCC(=C(CC)C1=CC=C(C=C1)OC(=O)C2=CC=CO2)C3=CC=C(C=C3)OC(=O)C4=CC=CO4
- InChI: InChI=1S/C28H24O6/c1-3-23(19-9-13-21(14-10-19)33-27(29)25-7-5-17-31-25)24(4-2)20-11-15-22(16-12-20)34-28(30)26-8-6-18-32-26/h5-18H,3-4H2,1-2H3/b24-23+; Key:VUDMUAVGKIZQRY-WCWDXBQESA-N

Furostilbestrol (INN), also known as diethylstilbestrol di(2-furoate) or simply as diethylstilbestrol difuroate, is a synthetic, nonsteroidal estrogen of the stilbestrol group related to diethylstilbestrol, that was never marketed. It is an ester of diethylstilbestrol and was described in the literature in 1952.

== See also ==
- Diethylstilbestrol dipropionate
- Dimestrol
- Fosfestrol
- Mestilbol
