= Methestrol =

Chemical compound

Clinical data
- Trade names: Meprane
- Other names: Methoestrol; Metestrol; Promethestrol; Promethoestrol; Dimethylhexestrol
- Drug class: Nonsteroidal estrogen

Identifiers
- IUPAC name: 4-[4-(4-hydroxy-3-methylphenyl)hexan-3-yl]-2-methylphenol
- CAS Number: 130-73-4
- PubChem CID: 71620
- ChemSpider: 64688
- UNII: 199O25Z2BQ
- CompTox Dashboard (EPA): DTXSID90861783

Chemical and physical data
- Formula: C_{20}H_{26}O_{2}
- Molar mass: 298.426 g·mol^{−1}
- 3D model (JSmol): Interactive image
- SMILES: CCC(C1=CC(=C(C=C1)O)C)C(CC)C2=CC(=C(C=C2)O)C
- InChI: InChI=1S/C20H26O2/c1-5-17(15-7-9-19(21)13(3)11-15)18(6-2)16-8-10-20(22)14(4)12-16/h7-12,17-18,21-22H,5-6H2,1-4H3; Key:PYWBJEDBESDHNP-UHFFFAOYSA-N

Methestrol (INN; brand name Meprane) or methoestrol, also known as promethestrol or promethoestrol (BAN) or as dimethylhexestrol, is a synthetic nonsteroidal estrogen of the stilbestrol group related to diethylstilbestrol which is no longer marketed.

A related drug is methestrol dipropionate (or promethestrol dipropionate) (brand name Meprane Dipropionate).

== See also ==
- Benzestrol
- Dienestrol
- Hexestrol
