= Diethylstilbestrol dilaurate =

Chemical compound

Clinical data
- Trade names: Acnestrol-Lotion

Identifiers
- IUPAC name: 4-[(3E)-4-[4-(Dodecanoyloxy)phenyl]hex-3-en-3-yl]phenyl dodecanoate
- PubChem CID: 165365743
- ChemSpider: 129557573
- CompTox Dashboard (EPA): DTXSID201046829

Chemical and physical data
- Formula: C_{42}H_{64}O_{4}
- Molar mass: 632.970 g·mol^{−1}
- 3D model (JSmol): Interactive image
- SMILES: CCCCCCCCCCCC(=O)OC1=CC=C(C=C1)C(\CC)=C(/CC)C1=CC=C(OC(=O)CCCCCCCCCCC)C=C1
- InChI: InChI=1S/C42H64O4/c1-5-9-11-13-15-17-19-21-23-25-41(43)45-37-31-27-35(28-32-37)39(7-3)40(8-4)36-29-33-38(34-30-36)46-42(44)26-24-22-20-18-16-14-12-10-6-2/h27-34H,5-26H2,1-4H3/b40-39+; Key:GEWSRLGHTICJOA-XQQUEIPISA-N

Diethylstilbestrol dilaurate (brand name Acnestrol-Lotion) is a synthetic, nonsteroidal estrogen of the stilbestrol group and an ester of diethylstilbestrol (DES) that was previously marketed but is now no longer available. It was formulated and used as a micronized topical medication to treat acne in adolescent boys and young men. The drug was marketed as early as 1951.
