= Triphenyliodoethylene =

Chemical compound

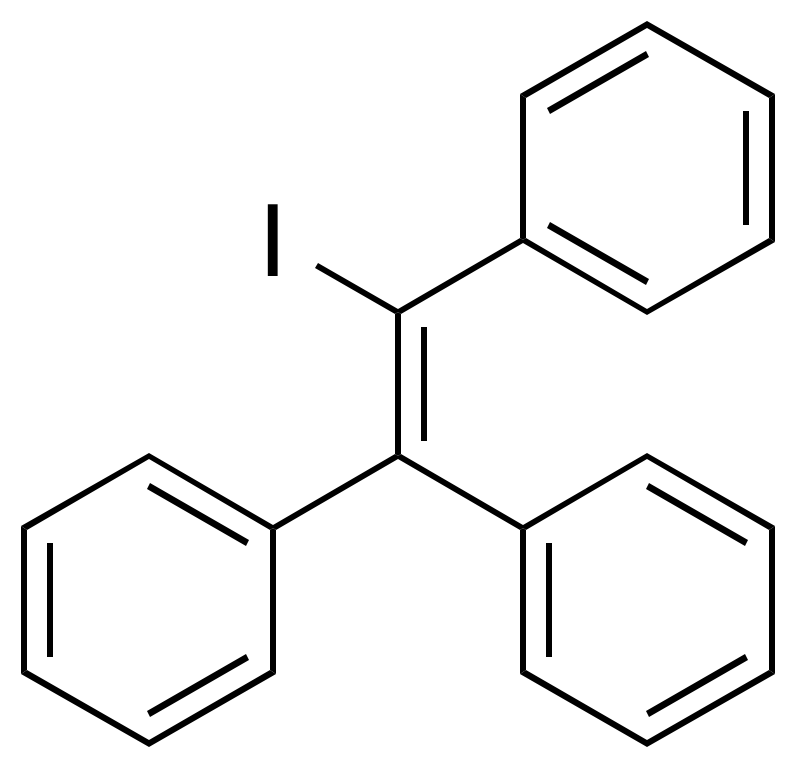

Clinical data
- Other names: TPIE; Iodotriphenylethylene; Phenylstilbene iodide; Triphenylvinyl iodide
- Drug class: Nonsteroidal estrogen

Identifiers
- IUPAC name: (1-iodo-2,2-diphenylethenyl)benzene
- CAS Number: 22021-09-6
- PubChem CID: 12139089
- CompTox Dashboard (EPA): DTXSID201337054

Chemical and physical data
- Formula: C_{20}H_{15}I
- Molar mass: 382.244 g·mol^{−1}
- 3D model (JSmol): Interactive image
- SMILES: C1=CC=C(C=C1)C(=C(C2=CC=CC=C2)I)C3=CC=CC=C3
- InChI: InChI=1S/C20H15I/c21-20(18-14-8-3-9-15-18)19(16-10-4-1-5-11-16)17-12-6-2-7-13-17/h1-15H; Key:DVJCEGLTPUEWNX-UHFFFAOYSA-N

Triphenyliodoethylene (TPIE), also known as iodotriphenylethylene or as phenylstilbene iodide, as well as triphenylvinyl iodide, is a synthetic nonsteroidal estrogen of the triphenylethylene group that is related to triphenylchloroethylene and triphenylbromoethylene and was never marketed.

== SAR ==
Although the effect of vinylic halogenation has already been discussed, it was discovered that Triphenylacrylonitrile [6304-33-2] also potently modulates the estrogen receptor. The synthesis of this agent is described in the pendant literature.

== See also ==
- Broparestrol
- Chlorotrianisene
- Estrobin
