= 17β-Methyl-17α-dihydroequilenin =

Chemical compound

Clinical data
- Other names: NCI-122; 17β-Methyl-6,8-didehydro-17α-estradiol; 17β-Methylestra-1,3,5(10),6,8-pentaene-3,17α-diol
- Drug class: Estrogen

Identifiers
- IUPAC name: (13S,14S,17R)-13,17-dimethyl-12,14,15,16-tetrahydro-11H-cyclopenta[a]phenanthrene-3,17-diol
- CAS Number: 1011733-40-6
- PubChem CID: 9549180
- ChemSpider: 7828102
- UNII: ZP488KVU9Q
- CompTox Dashboard (EPA): DTXSID201336494

Chemical and physical data
- Formula: C_{19}H_{22}O_{2}
- Molar mass: 282.383 g·mol^{−1}
- 3D model (JSmol): Interactive image
- SMILES: C[C@]12CCC3=C([C@@H]1CC[C@@]2(C)O)C=CC4=C3C=CC(=C4)O
- InChI: InChI=1S/C19H22O2/c1-18-9-7-15-14-6-4-13(20)11-12(14)3-5-16(15)17(18)8-10-19(18,2)21/h3-6,11,17,20-21H,7-10H2,1-2H3/t17-,18-,19+/m0/s1; Key:FQMQOMRDADWGJJ-GBESFXJTSA-N

17β-Methyl-17α-dihydroequilenin (developmental code name NCI-122), also known as 17β-methyl-6,8-didehydro-17α-estradiol, is a synthetic steroidal estrogen which was never marketed. It is the C17β methylated derivative of 17α-dihydroequilenin, an equine estrogen and constituent of conjugated estrogens (Premarin). 17α-Dihydroequilenin itself is an analogue of 17α-estradiol, the C17 epimer of estradiol (or 17β-estradiol). NCI-122 has respective relative binding affinities of about 8.1% and 16% for the ERα and ERβ when compared to estradiol. It is far less potent as an estrogen in comparison to estradiol, with relative estrogenic potencies at the ERα and ERβ of 1.4% and 0.81%, respectively. Nonetheless, NCI-122 acts as a full agonist of the ERα (ERβ was not assessed) and has estrogenic activity similar to that of estradiol at sufficiently high concentrations. The mechanisms of the lower potency of NCI-122 and related estrogens (e.g., 17α-estradiol and equilenin) relative to estradiol have been studied.
