= Dihydroequilin =

Dihydroequilin may refer to:

- 17α-Dihydroequilin
- 17β-Dihydroequilin

== See also ==
- Dihydroequilenin (disambiguation)
