= Bifluranol =

Mixture of two compounds

Clinical data
- Trade names: Prostarex
- Other names: BX-341
- Drug class: Nonsteroidal estrogen

Identifiers
- IUPAC name: 2-Fluoro-4-[3-(3-fluoro-4-hydroxyphenyl)pentan-2-yl]phenol
- CAS Number: 34633-34-6
- PubChem CID: 71713
- ChemSpider: 64763
- UNII: 47602X79JF
- ChEBI: CHEBI:135219
- ChEMBL: ChEMBL2105524

Chemical and physical data
- Formula: C_{17}H_{18}F_{2}O_{2}
- Molar mass: 292.326 g·mol^{−1}
- 3D model (JSmol): Interactive image
- SMILES: CCC(C1=CC(=C(C=C1)O)F)C(C)C2=CC(=C(C=C2)O)F
- InChI: InChI=1S/C17H18F2O2/c1-3-13(12-5-7-17(21)15(19)9-12)10(2)11-4-6-16(20)14(18)8-11/h4-10,13,20-21H,3H2,1-2H3; Key:RDVXUHOSYIBGBT-UHFFFAOYSA-N

Bifluranol (INN, BAN; brand name Prostarex; former developmental code name BX-341) is a synthetic nonsteroidal estrogen of the stilbestrol group related to diethylstilbestrol that has been used as an antiandrogen in the United Kingdom in the treatment of benign prostatic hyperplasia. The drug is described as a weak estrogen, and possesses about one-eighth the potency of diethylstilbestrol.

In spite of the fact that it is widely referred to as an antiandrogen in the literature, bifluranol is actually a pure estrogen and does not significantly bind to the androgen receptor or directly antagonize the action of androgens. It exerts functional antiandrogen effects by binding to and activating the estrogen receptor in the pituitary gland, consequently suppressing the secretion of luteinizing hormone (and hence acting as an antigonadotropin) and thereby reducing gonadal androgen production and systemic androgen levels. Bifluranol has also been found to act as a 17α-hydroxylase/17,20 lyase inhibitor, though with less potency than ketoconazole, and this action may contribute to its efficacy in benign prostatic hyperplasia by further helping to lower androgen levels.

Related drugs include pentafluranol (BX-430) and terfluranol (BX-428), which are also estrogens.

== See also ==
- Acefluranol
- Paroxypropione
- Metallibure
