= Diethylstilbestrol disulfate =

Chemical compound

Clinical data
- Trade names: Hydroestryl, Idroestril
- Other names: M.G. 137

Identifiers
- IUPAC name: [4-[(E)-4-(4-Sulfooxyphenyl)hex-3-en-3-yl]phenyl] hydrogen sulfate
- CAS Number: 316-23-4
- PubChem CID: 3034417
- ChemSpider: 2298875
- UNII: TCG918143B
- CompTox Dashboard (EPA): DTXSID101046838
- ECHA InfoCard: 100.005.690

Chemical and physical data
- Formula: C_{18}H_{20}O_{8}S_{2}
- Molar mass: 428.47 g·mol^{−1}
- 3D model (JSmol): Interactive image
- SMILES: CC/C(=C(/CC)\C1=CC=C(C=C1)OS(=O)(=O)O)/C2=CC=C(C=C2)OS(=O)(=O)O
- InChI: InChI=1S/C18H20O8S2/c1-3-17(13-5-9-15(10-6-13)25-27(19,20)21)18(4-2)14-7-11-16(12-8-14)26-28(22,23)24/h5-12H,3-4H2,1-2H3,(H,19,20,21)(H,22,23,24)/b18-17+; Key:JQFXYBUUBRTZSR-ISLYRVAYSA-N

Diethylstilbestrol disulfate (brand names Hydroestryl, Idroestril; former developmental code name M.G. 137) is a synthetic, nonsteroidal estrogen of the stilbestrol group and an ester of diethylstilbestrol (DES) that was formerly marketed but is now no longer available. It is described as an antineoplastic agent.
