= Alfred L. Wilds =

American academic (1915–2002)

Alfred Lawrence Wilds (1 March 1915 - 4 July 2002) was a professor emeritus of chemistry at the University of Wisconsin in Madison.

He graduated at the University of Michigan in 1937 and earned a Ph.D. in 1939.

His doctoral research was done under the guidance of Professor Werner E. Bachmann at Michigan at a time (the mid-1930s) when modern organic chemistry and synthesis was just starting to emerge. His thesis work is hailed even today as a major and revolutionary break with the past. The total synthesis of the steroidal sex hormone equilenin, published in the Journal of the American Chemical Society in 1940, was the first successful total synthesis of a complex natural product. In the context of the time, it was not a widely disseminated view that chemical structures of this degree of structural and stereochemical complexity could indeed be made from common starting chemicals. The Vitalism theory still distorted many people's views as to the relationship between "ordinary" chemicals and such esoterica as animal-isolated sex hormones. So the "Bachmann, Cole and Wilds" paper is widely recognized as inaugurating the modern era of chemical synthesis of complex medicinally important structures. 70+ years later, synthesis of such complex targets as HIV protease inhibitors are as a result of the equilenin synthesis by Al Wilds.

He was married to Carolyn Simcock Wilds.
