= Aminoxytriphene =

Clinical data
- Other names: Amotriphene, Myordil, Win 5494, Rimalcor.

Identifiers
- IUPAC name: 2,3,3-Tris(4-methoxyphenyl)-N,N-dimethylprop-2-en-1-amine
- CAS Number: 5585-64-8
- PubChem CID: 11283
- ChemSpider: 10809
- UNII: 5VO63T4936
- ChEBI: CHEBI:135648
- ChEMBL: ChEMBL2104048
- CompTox Dashboard (EPA): DTXSID60204446

Chemical and physical data
- Formula: C_{26}H_{29}NO_{3}
- Molar mass: 403.522 g·mol^{−1}
- 3D model (JSmol): Interactive image
- SMILES: CN(C)CC(=C(C1=CC=C(C=C1)OC)C2=CC=C(C=C2)OC)C3=CC=C(C=C3)OC
- InChI: InChI=1S/C26H29NO3/c1-27(2)18-25(19-6-12-22(28-3)13-7-19)26(20-8-14-23(29-4)15-9-20)21-10-16-24(30-5)17-11-21/h6-17H,18H2,1-5H3; Key:FRQGJOFRWIILCX-UHFFFAOYSA-N

Amotriphene is a coronary vasodilator that was developed at Sterling Drug in the early 1960s. It has selective binding to alpha-adrenergic receptors.

As a triphenylethylene, it has a structure similar to chlorotrianisene, although it is not thought to function as a non-steroidal synthetic estrogen.

Its pharmacology has been studied.

== Synthesis ==
The literature procedure that was published involved Mannich reaction to desoxyanisoin followed by organometallic addition of anisyl magnesium bromide and dehydration of the resulting alcohol.
