= Triphenylbromoethylene =

Chemical compound

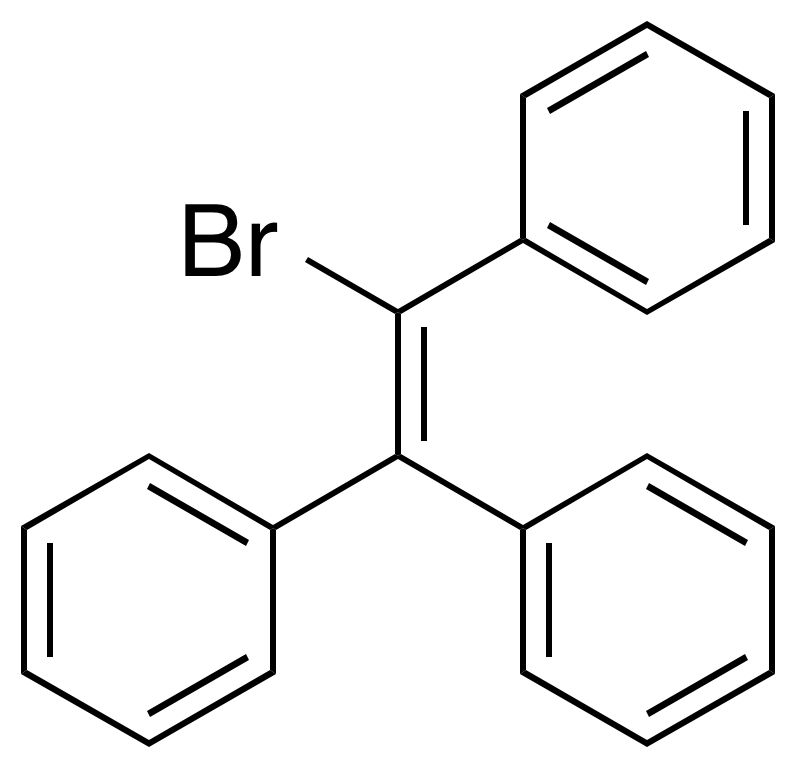

Clinical data
- Trade names: Bromylene, Eitriphin, Oestronyl, Prostilban, Tribenorm
- Other names: TPBE; Tribromophenylethylene; Bromotriphenylethylene; Phenylstilbene bromide; Fenbrostilbenum
- Drug class: Nonsteroidal estrogen

Identifiers
- IUPAC name: (1-bromo-2,2-diphenylethenyl)benzene
- CAS Number: 1607-57-4
- PubChem CID: 15354
- ChemSpider: 14615
- UNII: MRW5MKO6LZ
- CompTox Dashboard (EPA): DTXSID80166971
- ECHA InfoCard: 100.015.029

Chemical and physical data
- Formula: C_{20}H_{15}Br
- Molar mass: 335.244 g·mol^{−1}
- 3D model (JSmol): Interactive image
- SMILES: C1=CC=C(C=C1)C(=C(C2=CC=CC=C2)Br)C3=CC=CC=C3
- InChI: InChI=1S/C20H15Br/c21-20(18-14-8-3-9-15-18)19(16-10-4-1-5-11-16)17-12-6-2-7-13-17/h1-15H; Key:VUQVJIUBUPPCDB-UHFFFAOYSA-N

Triphenylbromoethylene (TPBE; brand names Bromylene, Eitriphin, Oestronyl, Prostilban, Tribenorm), also known as bromotriphenylethylene or as phenylstilbene bromide, is a synthetic nonsteroidal estrogen of the triphenylethylene group that was marketed in the 1940s similarly to the closely related estrogen triphenylchloroethylene.

== SAR ==
A diethoxylated derivative of triphenylbromoethylene, estrobin (DBE), is also an estrogen, but, in contrast, was never marketed. An ethylated derivative of triphenylbromoethylene, broparestrol (BDPE), is a selective estrogen receptor modulator (SERM) that has been marketed.

Although the vinylic halogens has already been discussed, it was discovered that Triphenylacrylonitrile [6304-33-2] also potently modulates the estrogen receptor.

== Synthesis and reactions ==
The synthesis of triphenylbromoethylene has been discussed previously:

Grignard reaction of Triphenylbromoethylene with carbon dioxide gives a compound that is called Triphenylacrylic acid [4452-05-5]. The acid can then undergo esterification with Diethylethanolamine [100-37-8] (via the acid chloride for example would work). This agent was claimed to have hormonal activity but was also stated to function as a coronary vasodilator. In terms of the SAR it is counselled to consider an agent that is called Cinnamaverine [1679-75-0]. Cinnamaverine has the same structure as the compound just described but differs in that it was made by the esterification of 2,3-diphenylacrylic acid [91-48-5]. By contrast though, Cinnamaverine was claimed to function as a Local anaesthetic, antispasmodic agent.

It does need to be said though that saponification of Triphenylacrylonitrile [6304-33-2] would also yield the Triphenylacrylic acid. It is worth pointing out that this compound was made by a reaction that is called a Knoevenagel condensation. (The related Perkin reaction only works with benzaldehydes and not benzophenones.)

== See also ==
- Chlorotrianisene
- M2613
- Triphenyliodoethylene
