= Allenolic acid =

Chemical compound

Identifiers
- IUPAC name: 3-(6-Hydroxynaphthalen-2-yl)propanoic acid
- CAS Number: 553-39-9
- PubChem CID: 96227
- ChemSpider: 86868
- UNII: I2MQT1CC3H
- ChEBI: CHEBI:34529
- CompTox Dashboard (EPA): DTXSID10203823

Chemical and physical data
- Formula: C_{13}H_{12}O_{3}
- Molar mass: 216.236 g·mol^{−1}
- 3D model (JSmol): Interactive image
- SMILES: C1=CC2=C(C=CC(=C2)O)C=C1CCC(=O)O
- InChI: InChI=1S/C13H12O3/c14-12-5-4-10-7-9(2-6-13(15)16)1-3-11(10)8-12/h1,3-5,7-8,14H,2,6H2,(H,15,16); Key:NHGXZNWPADXVOA-UHFFFAOYSA-N

Allenolic acid, or allenoic acid, is a synthetic, nonsteroidal estrogen discovered in 1947 or 1948 that, although studied clinically, was never marketed. It is an open-ring or seco-analogue of steroidal estrogens like estrone and equilenin. The compound was named after Edgar Allen, one of the pioneers in estrogen research. Although described as an estrogen, allenolic acid probably is totally inactive at the receptor, whereas a derivative, allenestrol (α,α-dimethyl-β-ethylallenolic acid), is reported to be a potent estrogen. Another derivative of allenolic acid (specifically 6-methoxy-allenestrol), methallenestril (brand name Vallestril), is also a potent estrogen and, in contrast to allenolic acid and allenestrol, has been marketed.

== See also ==
- Bisdehydrodoisynolic acid
- Doisynoestrol
- Doisynolic acid
