= Terfluranol =

Synthetic estrogen

Clinical data
- ATC code: None

Identifiers
- IUPAC name: 4-[(2R,3S)-5,5,5-trifluoro-3-(4-hydroxyphenyl)pentan-2-yl]phenol
- CAS Number: 64396-09-4
- PubChem CID: 3085293
- ChemSpider: 2342233
- UNII: WUF1DL156G
- ChEMBL: ChEMBL2105462
- CompTox Dashboard (EPA): DTXSID60214601

Chemical and physical data
- Formula: C_{17}H_{17}F_{3}O_{2}
- Molar mass: 310.316 g·mol^{−1}
- 3D model (JSmol): Interactive image
- SMILES: CC(C1=CC=C(C=C1)O)C(CC(F)(F)F)C2=CC=C(C=C2)O
- InChI: InChI=1S/C17H17F3O2/c1-11(12-2-6-14(21)7-3-12)16(10-17(18,19)20)13-4-8-15(22)9-5-13/h2-9,11,16,21-22H,10H2,1H3/t11-,16-/m0/s1; Key:KTUJPJJUMKZGCV-ZBEGNZNMSA-N

Terfluranol (INN, BAN; development code BX-428) is a synthetic, nonsteroidal estrogen of the stilbestrol group related to diethylstilbestrol that was developed for the treatment of breast cancer but was never marketed. It was described in the medical literature in 1974.

== See also ==
- Acefluranol
- Bifluranol
- Pentafluranol
