= Methallenestril =

Chemical compound

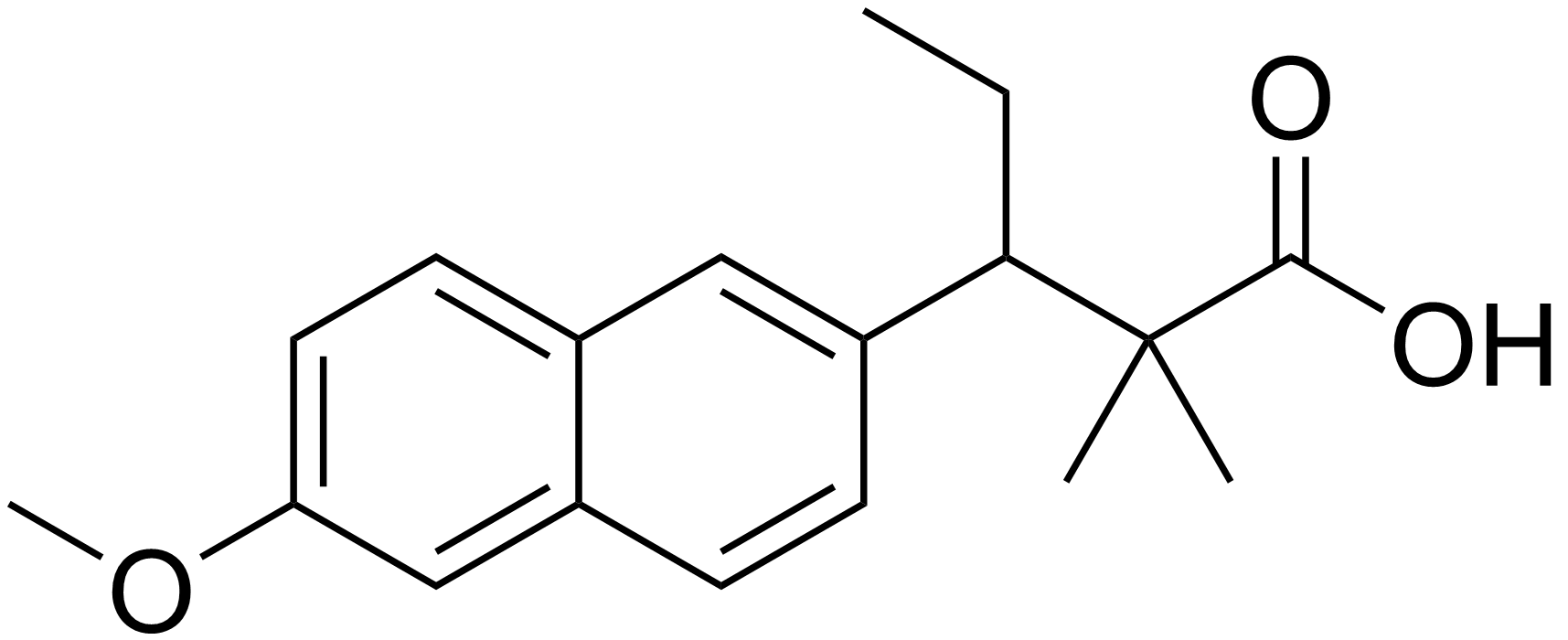

Clinical data
- Trade names: Cur-men, Ercostrol, Geklimon, Novestrine, Vallestril (also spelled Vallestrol or Vallestryl)
- Other names: Methallenoestril; Methallenestrol; Methallenoestrol; Horeau's acid; Allenestrol 6-methyl ether; α,α-Dimethyl-β-ethylallenolic acid 6-methyl ether; β-Ethyl-6-methoxy-α,α-dimethyl-2-naphthalenepropionic acid
- Routes of administration: By mouth
- Drug class: Nonsteroidal estrogen
- ATC code: G03CB03 (WHO) G03CC03 (WHO)

Identifiers
- IUPAC name: 3-(6-Methoxynaphthalen-2-yl)-2,2-dimethylpentanoic acid
- CAS Number: 517-18-0
- PubChem CID: 10599
- ChemSpider: 10154
- UNII: XL025389JS
- CompTox Dashboard (EPA): DTXSID7023275
- ECHA InfoCard: 100.007.485

Chemical and physical data
- Formula: C_{18}H_{22}O_{3}
- Molar mass: 286.371 g·mol^{−1}
- 3D model (JSmol): Interactive image
- SMILES: CCC(c1ccc2cc(OC)ccc2c1)C(C)(C)C(=O)O
- InChI: InChI=1S/C18H22O3/c1-5-16(18(2,3)17(19)20)14-7-6-13-11-15(21-4)9-8-12(13)10-14/h6-11,16H,5H2,1-4H3,(H,19,20); Key:KHLJKRBMZVNZOC-UHFFFAOYSA-N

Methallenestril (INN) (brand names Cur-men, Ercostrol, Geklimon, Novestrine, Vallestril), also known as methallenoestril (BAN) and as methallenestrol, as well as Horeau's acid, is a synthetic nonsteroidal estrogen and a derivative of allenolic acid and allenestrol (specifically, a methyl ether of it) that was formerly used to treat menstrual issues but is now no longer marketed. It is a seco-analogue of bisdehydrodoisynolic acid, and although methallenestril is potently estrogenic in rats, in humans it is only weakly so in comparison. Vallestril was a brand of methallenestril issued by G. D. Searle & Company in the 1950s. Methallenestril is taken by mouth. By the oral route, a dose of 25 mg methallenestril is approximately equivalent to 1 mg diethylstilbestrol, 4 mg dienestrol, 20 mg hexestrol, 25 mg estrone, 2.5 mg conjugated estrogens, and 0.05 mg ethinylestradiol.

== Synthesis ==
The chemical synthesis has been described. Unavailable methods:

The Grignard reaction between 2-propionyl-6-methoxynaphthalene (promen) [2700-47-2] (1) and Ethyl 2-bromoisobutyrate [600-00-0] (2) occurs to give ethyl beta-ethyl-beta-hydroxy-6-methoxy-alpha,alpha-dimethylnaphthalene-2-propionate [85536-81-8] (3). Dehydration of the carbinol in aqueous lye may be accompanied by saponification of the ester (although not in the patented version) to give [60533-05-3] (4). Re-esterification with diazomethane gave (5). Catalytic hydrogenation of the olefin led to PC608080 (6). Saponification of the ester completed the synthesis of Methallenestril (7).

An alternative method is described in the patent that relies on 2-cyano-6-methoxynaphthalene (cyanonerolin) [67886-70-8]. The precursor to this is described in a Hoechst patent.

== See also ==
- Carbestrol
- Fenestrel
- Doisynoestrol
- Doisynolic acid
- SC-4289 & allenestrol
