= Mytatrienediol =

Chemical compound

Clinical data
- Other names: SC-6924; Manvene; Anvene; 3-Methoxy-16α-methylestra-1,3,5(10)-triene-16β,17β-diol; 16α-Methylestriol 3-methyl ether; 16β-Hydroxy-16α-methylestradiol 3-methyl ether
- Routes of administration: By mouth
- Drug class: Estrogen; Estrogen ether

Identifiers
- IUPAC name: (8R,9S,13S,14S,16S,17R)-3-methoxy-13,16-dimethyl-7,8,9,11,12,14,15,17-octahydro-6H-cyclopenta[a]phenanthrene-16,17-diol
- CAS Number: 5108-94-1
- PubChem CID: 5282364
- ChemSpider: 4445527
- UNII: 1G3TKH1O14
- KEGG: C14242
- ChEBI: CHEBI:34859
- CompTox Dashboard (EPA): DTXSID1022500

Chemical and physical data
- Formula: C_{20}H_{28}O_{3}
- Molar mass: 316.441 g·mol^{−1}
- 3D model (JSmol): Interactive image
- SMILES: CC12CCC3C(C1CC(C2O)(C)O)CCC4=C3C=CC(=C4)OC
- InChI: InChI=1S/C20H28O3/c1-19-9-8-15-14-7-5-13(23-3)10-12(14)4-6-16(15)17(19)11-20(2,22)18(19)21/h5,7,10,15-18,21-22H,4,6,8-9,11H2,1-3H3/t15-,16-,17+,18-,19+,20+/m1/s1; Key:OOVXZFCPCSVSEM-NADOGSGZSA-N

Mytatrienediol (developmental code name SC-6924; former tentative brand names Manvene, Anvene), also known as 16α-methyl-16β-epiestriol 3-methyl ether or 16β-hydroxy-16α-methylestradiol 3-methyl ether, is a synthetic steroidal estrogen medication and an estrogen ether which was derived from estriol and was developed for clinical use in the late 1950s but was never marketed. It was investigated as a weak and mildly estrogenic medication for men to treat atherosclerosis, improve serum lipid profiles, and reduce the risk of myocardial infarction. However, while preclinical research supported the profile of mytatriendiol as a weak estrogen, the medication was found in clinical trials to produce estrogenic side effects including feminization, breast pain, and gynecomastia in men similarly and comparably to other estrogens such as ethinylestradiol and conjugated estrogens, and its side effects ultimately precluded its use. The medication was also studied to treat bone pain in patients with multiple myeloma, metastatic bone disease, and osteoporosis, with effectiveness seen.

== See also ==
- List of estrogen esters § Ethers of steroidal estrogens
- SC-4289
- Triparanol
