= Mestilbol =

Chemical compound

Clinical data
- Trade names: Monomestro, Monomestrol
- Other names: Monomethylstilbestrol; Diethylstilbestrol monomethyl ether
- Drug class: Nonsteroidal estrogen; Estrogen ether

Identifiers
- IUPAC name: 4-[(E)-4-(4-methoxyphenyl)hex-3-en-3-yl]phenol
- CAS Number: 18839-90-2
- PubChem CID: 3032340
- ChemSpider: 2297337
- UNII: N44U12UW5N
- ChEBI: CHEBI:34702
- CompTox Dashboard (EPA): DTXSID90860231 DTXSID7022469, DTXSID90860231

Chemical and physical data
- Formula: C_{19}H_{22}O_{2}
- Molar mass: 282.383 g·mol^{−1}
- 3D model (JSmol): Interactive image
- SMILES: CCC(=C(CC)C1=CC=C(C=C1)OC)C2=CC=C(C=C2)O
- InChI: InChI=1S/C19H22O2/c1-4-18(14-6-10-16(20)11-7-14)19(5-2)15-8-12-17(21-3)13-9-15/h6-13,20H,4-5H2,1-3H3/b19-18+; Key:CKMDPZMWUZDKAI-VHEBQXMUSA-N

Mestilbol (brand name Monomestro or Monomestrol), also known as diethylstilbestrol monomethyl ether, is a synthetic nonsteroidal estrogen of the stilbestrol group related to diethylstilbestrol. It was developed by Wallace & Tiernan Company, patented in 1940, and introduced for medical use in the 1940s, but is now no longer marketed. Mestilbol was available both as oral tablets and in oil for intramuscular injection. The drug is gradually demethylated in the body into diethylstilbestrol and hence is a prodrug of diethylstilbestrol. Mestilbol is a highly active estrogen, although somewhat less so than diethylstilbestrol, but is longer-lasting in comparison.

== See also ==
- List of estrogen esters § Ethers of nonsteroidal estrogens
