= Benzestrol =

Chemical compound

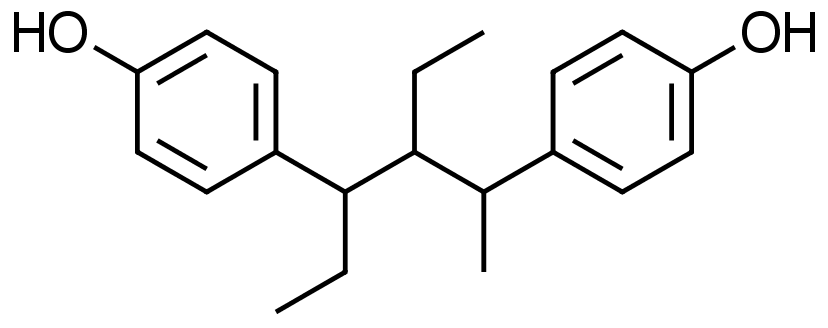

Clinical data
- Trade names: Chemestrogen, Ocestrol, Octestrol, Octoestrol, Octofollin
- Drug class: Nonsteroidal estrogen

Identifiers
- IUPAC name: 4,4'-(3-ethylhexane-2,4-diyl)diphenol
- CAS Number: 85-95-0
- PubChem CID: 6827
- ChemSpider: 6566
- UNII: A27512LR47
- ChEBI: CHEBI:135264
- ChEMBL: ChEMBL2104644
- CompTox Dashboard (EPA): DTXSID50861663

Chemical and physical data
- Formula: C_{20}H_{26}O_{2}
- Molar mass: 298.426 g·mol^{−1}
- 3D model (JSmol): Interactive image
- SMILES: CCC(C1=CC=C(C=C1)O)C(CC)C(C)C2=CC=C(C=C2)O
- InChI: InChI=1S/C20H26O2/c1-4-19(14(3)15-6-10-17(21)11-7-15)20(5-2)16-8-12-18(22)13-9-16/h6-14,19-22H,4-5H2,1-3H3; Key:DUTFBSAKKUNBAL-UHFFFAOYSA-N

Benzestrol (INN, BAN) (brand names Chemestrogen, Ocestrol, Octestrol, Octoestrol, Octofollin) is a synthetic nonsteroidal estrogen of the stilbestrol group which was formerly used medically but has since been discontinued. The stilbestrol estrogens, the best-known of which is diethylstilbestrol (DES), were used extensively in the mid-1900s before being banned in 1971 by the Food and Drug Administration due to their carcinogenic effects in the children of women who used them.

== Medical uses ==
Benzestrol and other stilbestrols were used as synthetic estrogens in order to prevent premature births. Based on the idea that premature births happened because the mother did not produce enough estrogen on her own, doctors prescribed benzestrol to mothers in order to increase their estrogen levels.

Studies have been done in the past on normal, mature and castrate female rats. Benzestrol produced the same type of estrus in the castrate rat when injected at 0.8 to 1.0 micrograms as when the rat was injected with 2.0 to 2.5 micrograms of estrone. This is significant because less benzestrol could be used to produce the same effect as estrone in increasing estrogen production. It has been used in the past as a nonsteroidal estrogen antagonist.

== Pharmacology ==
=== Pharmacodynamics ===
Benzestrol is described as a very potent estrogen. It is reported to have about 130% of the relative binding affinity of estradiol for the estrogen receptors.

== Chemistry ==
Benzestrol is usually grouped with the stilbestrol estrogens. However, benzestrol is technically not a stilbestrol derivative because its central chain is elongated by one carbon. In any case, it is a very close analogue of the stilbestrol estrogens.

A recent article discusses the isomer stereochemistry.

== Synthesis ==
The chemical synthesis has been discussed: Improved: Patents: Book notes (page 103):

A Claisen-Schmidt condensation between anisaldehyde [123-11-5] (1) and p-methoxybutyrophenone [4160-51-4] (2) gives the substituted chalcone [90-92-6] [71526-40-4] (3). Soft addition (Michael reaction) of ethylmagnesium bromide to the conjugate system gives introduces a second ethyl group into the molecule to yield 2-Ethyl-1,3-bis(4-methoxyphenyl)pentan-1-one, PC71777307 (4). {Although this reaction was performed with a Grignard reagent, addition of Copper(I) chloride catalyst or Gilman reagent is the modern take to mitigate the "hard" addition side reaction to the ketone. For example, this is needed to know for phenyltropane and nocaine chemistry}. For the next step, addition of methylmagnesium bromide to the remaining carbonyl gave the carbinol (5). Dehydration of the alcohol and reduction of the olefin gives Benzestrol Dimethyl Ether [131-87-3] (6). Cleavage of both the ethers then completes the synthesis of Benzestrol (7).

== History ==
Benzestrol is a drug in the stilbestrol family of estrogens. These drugs were first produced in the late 1930s. Benzestrol itself was reported in 1946. In 1953, experiments began on benzestrol and other stilbestrols to see if they actually helped stop premature births. This study in 1953 found that benzestrol did not in fact help stop premature births. A study in 1971 found that benzestrol was the cause of a rare vaginal cancer in girls and women whose mothers had been on benzestrol while pregnant.

== See also ==
- Dienestrol
- Hexestrol
- Methestrol
