= Pentafluranol =

Chemical compound

Clinical data
- ATC code: None

Identifiers
- IUPAC name: 2-Fluoro-4-[5,5,5-trifluoro-3-(3-fluoro-4-hydroxyphenyl)pentan-2-yl]phenol
- CAS Number: 65634-39-1
- PubChem CID: 3047826
- ChemSpider: 16737041
- UNII: 95RFZ48151
- ChEMBL: ChEMBL2105409
- CompTox Dashboard (EPA): DTXSID001024356

Chemical and physical data
- Formula: C_{17}H_{15}F_{5}O_{2}
- Molar mass: 346.297 g·mol^{−1}
- 3D model (JSmol): Interactive image
- SMILES: CC(C1=CC(=C(C=C1)O)F)C(CC(F)(F)F)C2=CC(=C(C=C2)O)F
- InChI: InChI=1S/C17H15F5O2/c1-9(10-2-4-15(23)13(18)6-10)12(8-17(20,21)22)11-3-5-16(24)14(19)7-11/h2-7,9,12,23-24H,8H2,1H3; Key:PRRSFMGODMUPJN-UHFFFAOYSA-N

Pentafluranol (INN, BAN; developmental code BX-430) is a synthetic, nonsteroidal estrogen of the stilbestrol group related to diethylstilbestrol that was developed for the treatment of benign prostatic hyperplasia never marketed. It was described in the medical literature in 1974.

== See also ==
- Acefluranol
- Bifluranol
- Terfluranol
