= Fenestrel =

Chemical compound

Clinical data
- Other names: Demethoxycarbestrol; NSC-86465; 2-methyl-3-ethyl-4-phenyl-δ^{4}-cyclohexenecarboxylic acid
- ATC code: None

Identifiers
- IUPAC name: 5-Ethyl-6-methyl-4-phenylcyclohex-3-ene-1-carboxylic acid
- CAS Number: 7698-97-7
- PubChem CID: 24371
- ChemSpider: 22786
- UNII: LEC4215V9R
- CompTox Dashboard (EPA): DTXSID20864106

Chemical and physical data
- Formula: C_{16}H_{20}O_{2}
- Molar mass: 244.334 g·mol^{−1}
- 3D model (JSmol): Interactive image
- SMILES: CCC1C(C(CC=C1C2=CC=CC=C2)C(=O)O)C
- InChI: InChI=1S/C16H20O2/c1-3-13-11(2)14(16(17)18)9-10-15(13)12-7-5-4-6-8-12/h4-8,10-11,13-14H,3,9H2,1-2H3,(H,17,18); Key:CLMFEXDZPBGYQQ-UHFFFAOYSA-N

Fenestrel (INN, USAN) (developmental code name ORF-3858) is a synthetic, nonsteroidal estrogen that was developed as a postcoital contraceptive in the 1960s but was never marketed. Synthesized by Ortho Pharmaceutical in 1961 and studied extensively, it was coined the "morning-after-pill" or "postcoital antifertility agent". Fenestrel is a seco analogue of doisynolic acid, and a member of the cyclohexenecarboxylic acid series of estrogens.

== See also ==
- Carbestrol
- Methallenestril
- Doisynoestrol
- Bisdehydrodoisynolic acid
- Anordrin
