= Anordiol =

Chemical compound

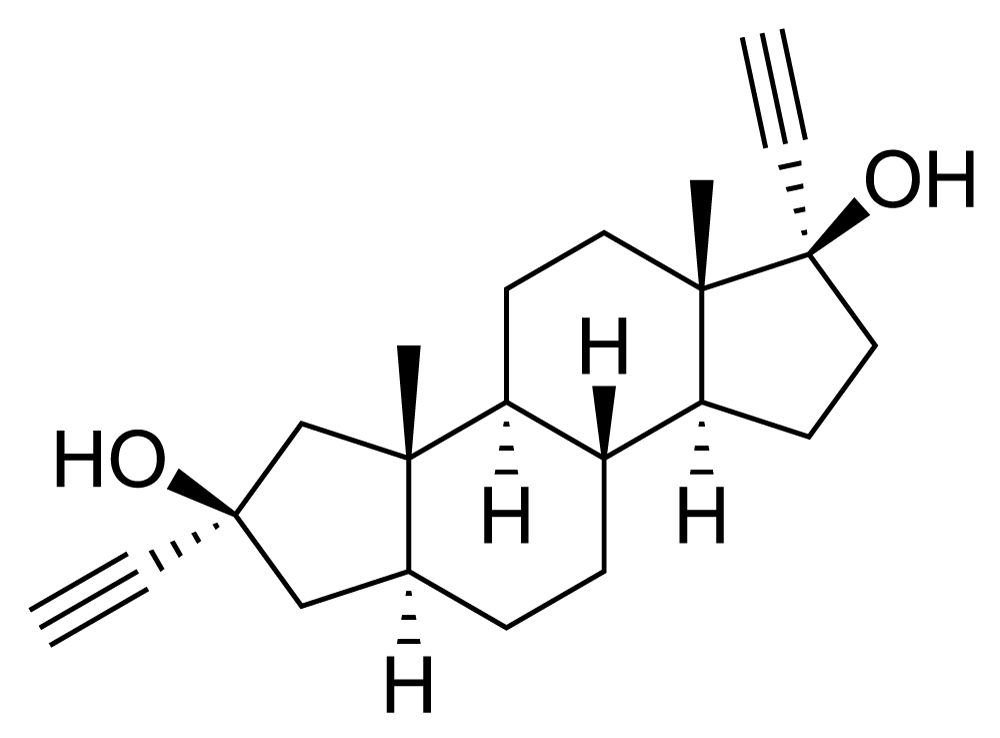

Clinical data
- Other names: Anordriol; 2α,17α-Diethynyl-A-nor-5α-androstane-2β,17β-diol

Identifiers
- IUPAC name: (2R,3aS,3bS,5aS,6R,8aS,8bR,10aS)-2,6-diethynyl-3a,5a-dimethyl-1,3,3b,4,5,7,8,8a,8b,9,10,10a-dodecahydroindeno[5,4-e]indene-2,6-diol
- CAS Number: 1045-29-0
- PubChem CID: 164779
- ChemSpider: 144454
- UNII: 5G6H10Z92J
- CompTox Dashboard (EPA): DTXSID60909005

Chemical and physical data
- Formula: C_{22}H_{30}O_{2}
- Molar mass: 326.480 g·mol^{−1}
- 3D model (JSmol): Interactive image
- SMILES: C[C@]12CC[C@H]3[C@H]([C@@H]1CC[C@]2(C#C)O)CC[C@@H]4[C@@]3(C[C@](C4)(C#C)O)C
- InChI: InChI=1S/C22H30O2/c1-5-21(23)13-15-7-8-16-17(19(15,3)14-21)9-11-20(4)18(16)10-12-22(20,24)6-2/h1-2,15-18,23-24H,7-14H2,3-4H3/t15-,16+,17-,18-,19-,20-,21+,22-/m0/s1; Key:HUUUMTTWAPMBMU-ZBJWQKIUSA-N

Anordiol, or anordriol, also known as 2α,17α-diethynyl-A-nor-5α-androstane-2β,17β-diol, is a synthetic steroid-like mixed estrogen and antiestrogen and an active metabolite of anordrin, a postcoital contraceptive that is marketed and used in China. Relative to anordrin, anordiol has similar but more potent actions.
