= Anordrin =

Chemical compound

Clinical data
- Trade names: Zi Yun (with mifepristone)
- Other names: AF-53; α-Anordrin; Anordrine; 2α,17α-Diethynyl-A-nor-5α-androstane-2β,17β-diol dipropionate
- Routes of administration: By mouth
- Drug class: Selective estrogen receptor modulator

Pharmacokinetic data
- Metabolites: Anordiol

Identifiers
- IUPAC name: [(2R,3aS,3bS,5aS,6R,8aS,8bR,10aS)-2,6-diethynyl-3a,5a-dimethyl-2-propanoyloxy-1,3,3b,4,5,7,8,8a,8b,9,10,10a-dodecahydroindeno[5,4-e]inden-6-yl] propanoate
- CAS Number: 56470-64-5
- PubChem CID: 6917889
- ChemSpider: 5293109
- UNII: 6R25F2A061
- CompTox Dashboard (EPA): DTXSID40872682

Chemical and physical data
- Formula: C_{28}H_{38}O_{4}
- Molar mass: 438.608 g·mol^{−1}
- 3D model (JSmol): Interactive image
- SMILES: CCC(=O)O[C@]1(CC[C@@H]2[C@@]1(CC[C@H]3[C@H]2CC[C@@H]4[C@@]3(C[C@](C4)(C#C)OC(=O)CC)C)C)C#C
- InChI: InChI=1S/C28H38O4/c1-7-23(29)31-27(9-3)17-19-11-12-20-21(25(19,5)18-27)13-15-26(6)22(20)14-16-28(26,10-4)32-24(30)8-2/h3-4,19-22H,7-8,11-18H2,1-2,5-6H3/t19-,20+,21-,22-,25-,26-,27+,28-/m0/s1; Key:NOECSYBNZHIVHW-LKADTRSGSA-N

Anordrin (former developmental code name AF-53), also known as 2α,17α-diethynyl-A-nor-5α-androstane-2β,17β-diol dipropionate, is a synthetic, steroidal selective estrogen receptor modulator (SERM) which is used in China as an emergency contraceptive. It is the most commonly used emergency contraceptive in China. The drug is marketed in a combination formulation with mifepristone under the brand name Zi Yun. Anordrin has not been studied for use or marketed outside of China. It has been used in China since the 1970s.

Anordrin has both weak estrogenic and antiestrogenic activity. It binds to the estrogen receptor but does not bind to the androgen receptor or the progesterone receptor. In animals, anordrin has antigonadotropic effects, and in male animals, inhibits spermatogenesis and causes atrophy of the epididymis, prostate, and seminal vesicles. It produces a dihydroxylated active metabolite, anordiol, with similar but more potent estrogenic activity. The abortifacient effects of anordrin in animals are blocked by supplemental estradiol, suggesting that it is acting as an antiestrogen rather than an estrogen to exert its emergency contraceptive effects.

The drug is also referred to as tanqinyao, "the Chinese vacation pill" or "the pill for visiting relatives," given that it is a recommended contraception method for couples who have frequent sex within a short period, as may be the case for Chinese couples who live apart for most of the year due to work.

Anordrin is not approved for use in the United States because each pill is near, or in excess of, the total monthly maximum allowable hormone dose in the American system.

== See also ==
- List of selective estrogen receptor modulators
