= Alexander Haddow =

Scottish physician and pathologist

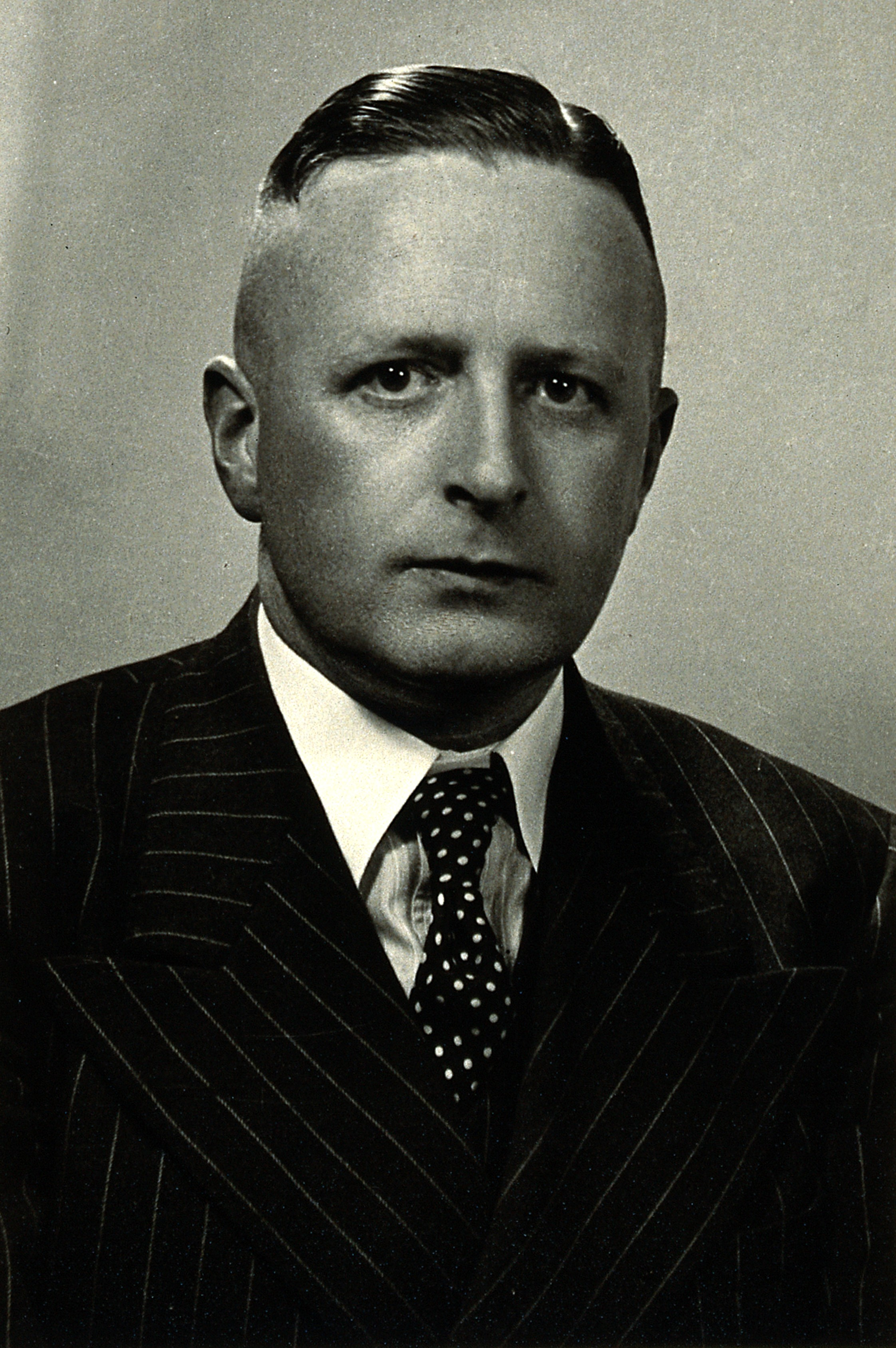
Portrait. Credit: Wellcome Collection

Sir Alexander Haddow FRS FRSE (18 January 1907 – 21 January 1976) was a Scottish physician and pathologist at the forefront of cancer research in the 1940s. He served as Director of the Institute of Cancer Research from 1946 to 1969. He was also President of the Universal Union Against Cancer.

His most important discovery was the Haddow Effect, by which a carcinogenic compound can be used to arrest a cancer whose origin is an unrelated carcinogen.

== Early life ==
Haddow was born on 18 January 1907 in Leven, Fife, Scotland to Margaret Docherty, daughter of a coachman, and William Haddow (d.1928) of Newharthill in Glasgow. His father and grandfather were coal-miners. The family moved to Broxburn, West Lothian, where his father ran Green Tree Tavern, a small bar and hotel.

At age 10, Haddow fell ill with scarlet fever and remained frail and introverted. By age of 11, Haddow also suffered from appendicitis. He was much impressed by the family GP, Dr Alexander Scott, who treated him on both occasions and became his role model. Dr Scott was known for his studies of skin cancers in the local mining population. Haddow attended Broxburn High School and then Broxburn Academy, winning the Dux Medal.

== Education ==
In 1929, Haddow graduated with an MB ChB from the University of Edinburgh.

== Career ==
Haddow was an assistant to Professor Thomas Jones Mackie at Edinburgh Royal Infirmary, also lecturing in bacteriology at the University of Edinburgh, where he became a full lecturer in 1932. The university awarded him with three doctorates (PhD 1937, MD 1937 and DSc 1938).

In 1936, he moved to London to join Ernest Kennaway's team at the Royal Cancer Hospital. In 1946, he succeeded Kennaway as Director of the Chester Beatty Research Institute, later renamed the Institute of Cancer Research.

In 1958, he was elected a Fellow of the Royal Society of London and, in 1961, was elected a Fellow of the Royal Society of Edinburgh, where his proposers included Alan William Greenwood, Robert Cruikshank, and Richard Swain. He was knighted by Queen Elizabeth II in 1966.

In 1972, he retired to Chalfont St Giles. By this time he was almost totally blind due to diabetes, which also caused the loss of his limbs.

== Personal life ==
In 1932, Haddow married Lucia Lindsay Crosby Black (d. 1968), a medical practitioner. Their son, William George Haddow, was born in 1934. After the death of his first wife, he remarried in 1970 to Mrs Feo Standing (née Garner; died 30 January 2013), a scientific photographer, 22 years his junior. He gained two step-children by this second marriage.

== Death ==
Haddow had diabetes and related blindness. On 21 January 1976, three days after his 69th birthday, Haddow died at Amersham General Hospital in Amersham, England. He was cremated.
