= Dihydroequilenin =

Dihydroequilenin may refer to:

- 17α-Dihydroequilenin
- 17β-Dihydroequilenin

== See also ==
- Dihydroequilin (disambiguation)
