= Doisynoestrol =

Chemical compound

Clinical data
- Trade names: Fenocyclin, Surestrine, Surestryl
- Other names: Diosynestrol; Fenocycline; Fenocyclin; Phenocyclin; RS-2874; Dehydrofolliculinic acid; cis-Bisdehydrodoisynolic acid 7-methyl ether; BDDA ME; NSC-56846; NSC-122041
- Routes of administration: By mouth
- Drug class: Nonsteroidal estrogen

Identifiers
- IUPAC name: 1-Ethyl-7-methoxy-2-methyl-3,4-dihydro-1H-phenanthrene-2-carboxylic acid
- CAS Number: 15372–34–6
- PubChem CID: 97911
- ChemSpider: 88384
- UNII: 2O436BJQ6T
- CompTox Dashboard (EPA): DTXSID4022496

Chemical and physical data
- Formula: C_{19}H_{22}O_{3}
- Molar mass: 298.382 g·mol^{−1}
- 3D model (JSmol): Interactive image
- SMILES: CCC1C2=C(CCC1(C)C(=O)O)C3=C(C=C2)C=C(C=C3)OC
- InChI: InChI=1S/C19H22O3/c1-4-17-16-7-5-12-11-13(22-3)6-8-14(12)15(16)9-10-19(17,2)18(20)21/h5-8,11,17H,4,9-10H2,1-3H3,(H,20,21); Key:HZZSXUIUESWVSS-UHFFFAOYSA-N

Doisynoestrol (brand names Fenocyclin, Surestrine, Surestryl; former developmental code name RS-2874), also known as fenocycline, as well as cis-bisdehydrodoisynolic acid 7-methyl ether (BDDA ME), is a synthetic nonsteroidal estrogen of the doisynolic acid group that is no longer marketed. It is a methyl ether of bisdehydrodoisynolic acid. Doisynoestrol was described in the literature in 1945. It has about 0.02% of the relative binding affinity of estradiol for the estrogen receptor.

== Activity ==
The methyl ether has the same activity as the alcohol making it one of the most potent oral estrogens ever discovered.

== Synthesis ==
The chemical synthesis has been described by Johnson & Graber: German method: Unavailable method:

The Stobbe condensation between 2-propionyl-6-methoxynaphthalene (Promen) [2700-47-2] (1) and diethyl succinate [123-25-1] (2) gives a mixture of unsaturated esters (3). Catalytic hydrogenation of the olefin and saponification of the ester yields (4). Intramolecular cyclization occurs first by reaction with acetyl chloride then with aluminium trichloride in nitromethane solvent to give 1-Ethyl-7-methoxy-4-oxo-1,3,4-tetrahydro-phenanthrene-2-carboxylic acid, PC287656 (5). Catalytic hydrogenation in the presence of perchloric acid led to reductive removal of the keto group in the newly formed ring giving 1-Ethyl-7-methoxy-1,2,3,4-tetrahydrophenanthrene-2-carboxylic acid, PC177705457 (6). Esterification of the remaining acid moiety in the presence of diazomethane gave Methyl 1-ethyl-7-methoxy-1,2,3,4-tetrahydrophenanthrene-2-carboxylate, PC151271 (7). Alkylation by means of triphenylmethyl sodium in the presence of iodomethane gave methyl 1-ethyl-7-methoxy-2-methyl-3,4-dihydro-1H-phenanthrene-2-carboxylate, PC162092603 (8). Lastly saponification of the ester completed the synthesis of Bisdehydrodoisynolic acid.

== See also ==
- Allenolic acid
- Carbestrol
- Methallenestril
- Fenestrel
