= Novadel-Agene =

American chemical company

Novadel-Agene was a Belleville, New Jersey–based company formed from the merger of Novadel Process Corporation and Agene Process in August 1928. Novadel Corporation was founded in 1926 to take over the American and Canadian rights to Novadel Process. Novadelox was first used in the bleaching of flour in the United States in 1921. Prior to this it had been used largely in European milling.

On September 23, 1953, one of its plants, in Tonawanda, New York, United States, exploded and caused 11 deaths.

== Merger ==
Novadel-Agene sought to merge with Wallace & Tiernan Company, which already owned a portion of its business. Wallace & Tiernan was also located in Belleville. A December 21, 1953, hearing in United States District Court in Providence, Rhode Island, sought to restrain the merger. A delay was sought until a civil antitrust suit against both corporations and others, was solved. The United States government wanted the Wallace & Tiernan Company to divest itself of its interest in Novadel-Agene prior to a merger. The merger was to become effective by December 31, 1953. Novadel-Agene retained its corporate entity but the joined companies became known as Wallace & Tiernan, Inc.
