= Carbestrol =

Chemical compound

Clinical data
- Other names: NSC-19962; ORF-2166
- ATC code: None

Identifiers
- IUPAC name: 3-Ethyl-4-(4-methoxyphenyl)-2-methylcyclohex-3-ene-1-carboxylic acid
- CAS Number: 1755-52-8
- PubChem CID: 15644
- ChemSpider: 14881
- UNII: C85AI8SOCH
- CompTox Dashboard (EPA): DTXSID70938669

Chemical and physical data
- Formula: C_{17}H_{22}O_{3}
- Molar mass: 274.360 g·mol^{−1}
- 3D model (JSmol): Interactive image
- SMILES: CCC1=C(CCC(C1C)C(=O)O)C2=CC=C(C=C2)OC
- InChI: InChI=1S/C17H22O3/c1-4-14-11(2)15(17(18)19)9-10-16(14)12-5-7-13(20-3)8-6-12/h5-8,11,15H,4,9-10H2,1-3H3,(H,18,19); Key:VJKVHUZOVAWKEB-UHFFFAOYSA-N

Carbestrol (developmental code names NSC-19962, ORF-2166) is a synthetic, nonsteroidal estrogen of the cyclohexenecarboxylic acid group and seco analogue of doisynolic acid that was described in the literature in 1956 and developed for the treatment of prostate cancer in the 1960s but was never marketed.

== See also ==
- Fenestrel
- Methallenestril
- Doisynoestrol
- Bisdehydrodoisynolic acid
