= Chlorotrianisene =

Chemical compound

Clinical data
- Trade names: Tace, Estregur, Anisene, Clorotrisin, Merbentyl, Triagen, others
- Other names: CTA; Trianisylchloroethylene; tri-p-Anisylchloroethylene; TACE; tris(p-Methoxyphenyl)-chloroethylene; NSC-10108
- AHFS/Drugs.com: Multum Consumer Information
- Routes of administration: By mouth
- Drug class: Nonsteroidal estrogen
- ATC code: G03CA06 (WHO)

Pharmacokinetic data
- Metabolism: Mono-O-demethylation (liver CYP450)
- Metabolites: Desmethylchlorotrianisene

Identifiers
- IUPAC name: 1,1',1''-(2-chloroethene-1,1,2-triyl)tris(4-methoxybenzene); 11-chloro-4,13-dimethoxy-12-(p-methoxyphenyl)stilbene
- CAS Number: 569-57-3
- PubChem CID: 11289
- IUPHAR/BPS: 7146
- DrugBank: DB00269
- ChemSpider: 10815
- UNII: 6V5034L121
- KEGG: D00269
- ChEBI: CHEBI:3641
- ChEMBL: ChEMBL1200761
- CompTox Dashboard (EPA): DTXSID1021299
- ECHA InfoCard: 100.008.472

Chemical and physical data
- Formula: C_{23}H_{21}ClO_{3}
- Molar mass: 380.87 g·mol^{−1}
- 3D model (JSmol): Interactive image
- SMILES: COc1ccc(C(Cl)=C(c2ccc(OC)cc2)c2ccc(OC)cc2)cc1
- InChI: InChI=1S/C23H21ClO3/c1-25-19-10-4-16(5-11-19)22(17-6-12-20(26-2)13-7-17)23(24)18-8-14-21(27-3)15-9-18/h4-15H,1-3H3; Key:BFPSDSIWYFKGBC-UHFFFAOYSA-N

Chlorotrianisene (CTA), also known as tri-p-anisylchloroethylene (TACE) and sold under the brand name Tace among others, is a nonsteroidal estrogen related to diethylstilbestrol (DES) which was previously used in the treatment of menopausal symptoms and estrogen deficiency in women and prostate cancer in men, among other indications, but has since been discontinued and is now no longer available. It is taken by mouth.

CTA is an estrogen, or an agonist of the estrogen receptors, the biological target of estrogens like estradiol. It is a high-efficacy partial estrogen and shows some properties of a selective estrogen receptor modulator, with predominantly estrogenic activity but also some antiestrogenic activity. CTA itself is inactive and is a prodrug in the body.

CTA was introduced for medical use in 1952. It has been marketed in the United States and Europe. However, it has since been discontinued and is no longer available in any country.

== Medical uses ==
CTA has been used in the treatment of menopausal symptoms and estrogen deficiency in women and prostate cancer in men, among other indications. It has been used to suppress lactation in women. CTA has been used in the treatment of acne as well.

Estrogen dosages for prostate cancer
Route/form	Estrogen	Dosage
Oral	Estradiol	1–2 mg 3x/day
Oral	Conjugated estrogens	1.25–2.5 mg 3x/day
Oral	Ethinylestradiol	0.15–3 mg/day
Oral	Ethinylestradiol sulfonate	1–2 mg 1x/week
Oral	Diethylstilbestrol	1–3 mg/day
Oral	Dienestrol	5 mg/day
Oral	Hexestrol	5 mg/day
Oral	Fosfestrol	100–480 mg 1–3x/day
Oral	Chlorotrianisene	12–48 mg/day
Oral	Quadrosilan	900 mg/day
Oral	Estramustine phosphate	140–1400 mg/day
Transdermal patch	Estradiol	2–6x 100 μg/day Scrotal: 1x 100 μg/day
IM or SC injection	Estradiol benzoate	1.66 mg 3x/week
IM or SC injection	Estradiol dipropionate	5 mg 1x/week
IM or SC injection	Estradiol valerate	10–40 mg 1x/1–2 weeks
IM or SC injection	Estradiol undecylate	100 mg 1x/4 weeks
IM or SC injection	Polyestradiol phosphate	Alone: 160–320 mg 1x/4 weeks With oral EE: 40–80 mg 1x/4 weeks
IM or SC injection	Estrone	2–4 mg 2–3x/week
IV injection	Fosfestrol	300–1200 mg 1–7x/week
IV injection	Estramustine phosphate	240–450 mg/day
Note: Dosages are not necessarily equivalent. Sources: See template.

== Side effects ==
In men, CTA can produce gynecomastia as a side effect. Conversely, it does not appear to lower testosterone levels in men, and hence does not seem to have a risk of hypogonadism and associated side effects in men.

== Pharmacology ==
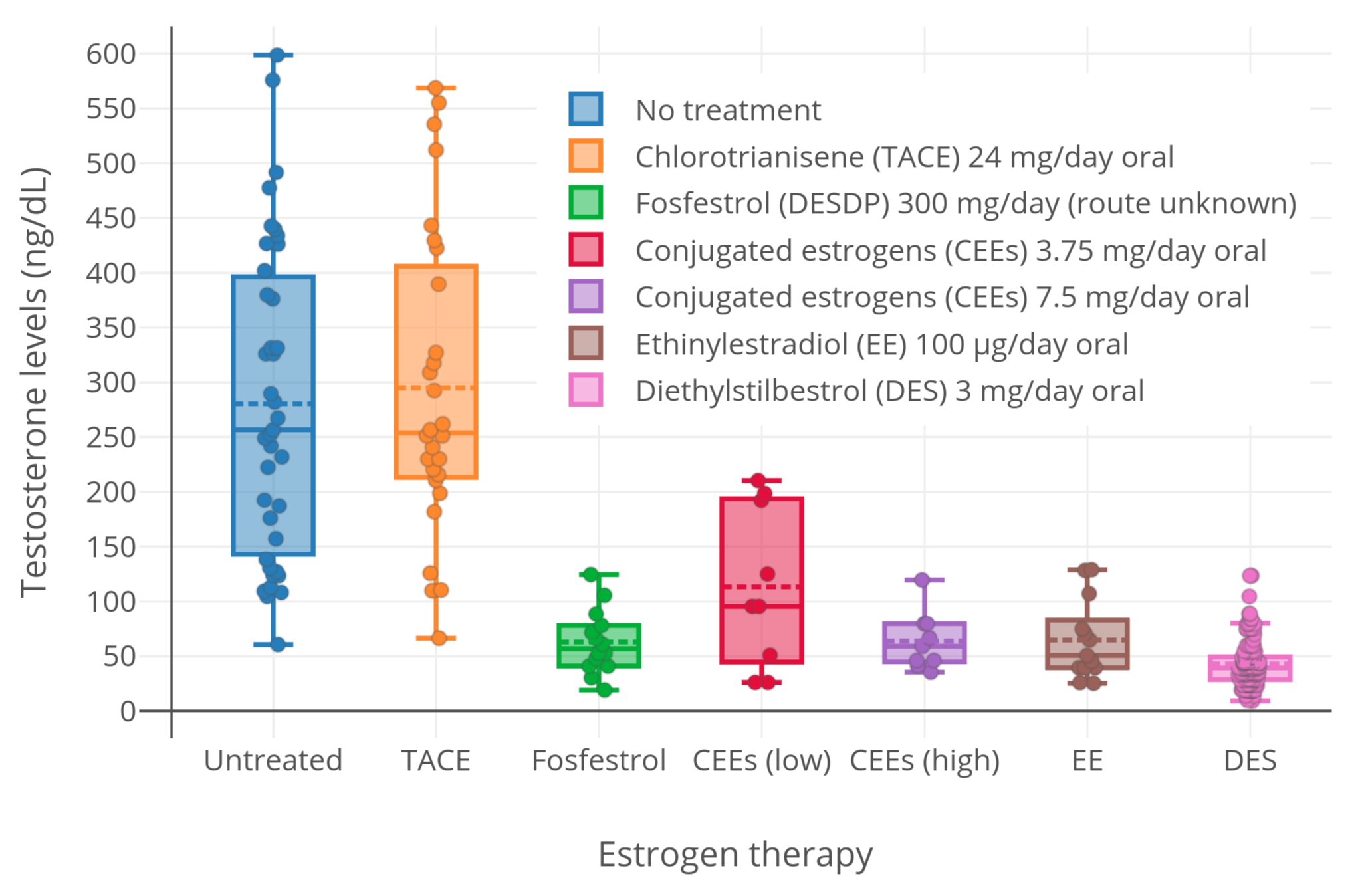
Testosterone levels with no treatment and with various estrogens in men with prostate cancer. Determinations were made with an early radioimmunoassay (RIA). Source was Shearer et al. (1973).

CTA is a relatively weak estrogen, with about one-eighth the potency of DES. However, it is highly lipophilic and is stored in fat tissue for prolonged periods of time, with its slow release from fat resulting in a very long duration of action. CTA itself is inactive; it behaves as a prodrug to desmethylchlorotrianisene (DMCTA), a weak estrogen that is formed as a metabolite via mono-O-demethylation of CTA in the liver. As such, the potency of CTA is reduced if it is given parenterally instead of orally.

Although it is referred to as a weak estrogen and was used solely as an estrogen in clinical practice, CTA is a high-efficacy partial agonist of the estrogen receptor. As such, it is a selective estrogen receptor modulator (SERM), with predominantly estrogenic effects but also with antiestrogenic effects, and was arguably the first SERM to ever be introduced. CTA can antagonize estradiol at the level of the hypothalamus, resulting in disinhibition of the hypothalamic–pituitary–gonadal axis and an increase in estrogen levels. Clomifene and tamoxifen were both derived from CTA via structural modification, and are much lower-efficacy partial agonists than CTA and hence much more antiestrogenic in comparison. As an example, chlorotrianisene produces gynecomastia in men, albeit reportedly to a lesser extent than other estrogens, while clomifene and tamoxifen do not and can be used to treat gynecomastia.

CTA at a dosage of 48 mg/day inhibits ovulation in almost all women. Conversely, it has been reported that CTA has no measurable effect on circulating levels of testosterone in men. This is in contrast to other estrogens, like diethylstilbestrol, which can suppress testosterone levels by as much as 96%—or to an equivalent extent as castration. These findings suggest that CTA is not an effective antigonadotropin in men.

== Chemistry ==
Chlorotrianisene, also known as tri-p-anisylchloroethylene (TACE) or as tris(p-methoxyphenyl)chloroethylene, is a synthetic nonsteroidal compound of the triphenylethylene group. It is structurally related to the nonsteroidal estrogen diethylstilbestrol and to the SERMs clomifene and tamoxifen.

It is structurally related to a compound that is called Aminoxytriphene (Amotriphene).

Chlorotrianisene is prepared by the halogenation of a compound called trianisylethylene [7109-27-5]. An improved version for the synthesis of this precursor is by the treatment of chloroacetyl chloride with 3 equivalents of Grignard reagent. Another synthetic pathway relies on Grignard addition to the corresponding benzophenone, or by the Grignard reaction with desoxyanisoin. Crenshaw & Zimmer reported some interesting methods too. E.g. Grignard reaction to alpha-chloro-4'-methoxyacetophenone [2196-99-8] was also demonstrated to work.

Trianisylethylene was also halogenated with bromine and found to give a,a,b-tri(p-anisyl)bromoethylene. According to one SAR survey, this agent was said to be an improvement over Estrobin. This earlier work accumulated in the synthesis of Chlorotrianisene. At least three newer syntheses are also recorded in the pendant literature for Chlorotrianisene. In one adventitious discovery, it was found that chlorotrianisene could be made from methoxychlor & anisole in a single step.

The halogenation step in this class of agents has the overall effect of replacing a vinylic hydrogen with a halogen atom. The reaction mechanism however can thought to be rationalized by a discrete halogenation step to give a vicinally dihalogenated compound, which is not isolated but then instead undergoes dehydrohalogenation step.

== History ==
CTA was introduced for medical use in the United States in 1952, and was subsequently introduced for use throughout Europe. It was the first estrogenic compound of the triphenylethylene series to be introduced. In comparison a commercial advertisement for Gynosone was made in 1946. CTA was derived from estrobin (DBE), a derivative of the very weakly estrogenic compound triphenylethylene (TPE), which in turn was derived from structural modification of diethylstilbestrol (DES). The SERMs clomifene and tamoxifen, as well as the antiestrogen ethamoxytriphetol, were derived from CTA via structural modification.

== Society and culture ==
=== Generic names ===
Chlorotrianisene is the generic name of the drug and its INN, USAN, and BAN. It is also known as tri-p-anisylchloroethylene (TACE).

=== Brand names ===
CTA has been marketed under the brand names Tace, Estregur, Anisene, Clorotrisin, Merbentyl, Merbentul, and Triagen among many others.

=== Availability ===
CTA is no longer marketed and hence is no longer available in any country. It was previously used in the United States and Europe.
