= Equilenin =

Chemical compound

Clinical data
- Other names: 6,8-Didehydroestrone; Estra-1,3,5(10),6,8-pentaen-3-ol-17-one
- Routes of administration: By mouth
- Drug class: Estrogen

Identifiers
- IUPAC name: (13S,14S)-3-hydroxy-13-methyl-12,14,15,16-tetrahydro-11H-cyclopenta[a]phenanthren-17-one
- CAS Number: 517-09-9
- PubChem CID: 444865
- DrugBank: DB03515
- ChemSpider: 392668
- UNII: W8FTJ17C4J
- KEGG: C14303
- ChEBI: CHEBI:34739
- ChEMBL: ChEMBL225546
- CompTox Dashboard (EPA): DTXSID2052156
- ECHA InfoCard: 100.007.483

Chemical and physical data
- Formula: C_{18}H_{18}O_{2}
- Molar mass: 266.340 g·mol^{−1}
- 3D model (JSmol): Interactive image
- SMILES: O=C4[C@]3(CCc1c(ccc2c1ccc(O)c2)[C@@H]3CC4)C
- InChI: InChI=1S/C18H18O2/c1-18-9-8-14-13-5-3-12(19)10-11(13)2-4-15(14)16(18)6-7-17(18)20/h2-5,10,16,19H,6-9H2,1H3/t16-,18-/m0/s1; Key:PDRGHUMCVRDZLQ-WMZOPIPTSA-N

Equilenin, also known as 6,8-didehydroestrone, as well as estra-1,3,5(10),6,8-pentaen-3-ol-17-one, is a naturally occurring steroidal estrogen obtained from the urine of pregnant mares. In the form of the sodium salt of the sulfate ester prodrug, known as sodium equilenin sulfate, it is used as one of the components in conjugated estrogens (brand name Premarin). It was the first complex natural product to be fully synthesized, in work reported by 1940 by Bachmann and Wilds.

== Chemistry ==
=== Synthesis ===
==== Total synthesis ====
The synthesis developed by the Bachmann group started from Butenand's ketone – the 7-methoxy structural analog of 1,2,3,4-tetrahydrophenanthren-1-one – and which can be readily prepared from 1,6-Cleve's acid. The approach was based on well-established transformations like the Claisen condensation, the Reformatsky reaction, the Arndt–Eistert reaction, and the Dieckmann condensation. Nicolaou described this preparation as ending the era preceding the post-World War II work of Robert Burns Woodward that introduced enantioselective synthesis; in this synthesis, a mixture of stereoisomers were prepared and then resolved, and the choice of target was partly because of the existence of only two chiral carbons and hence only four stereoisomers.

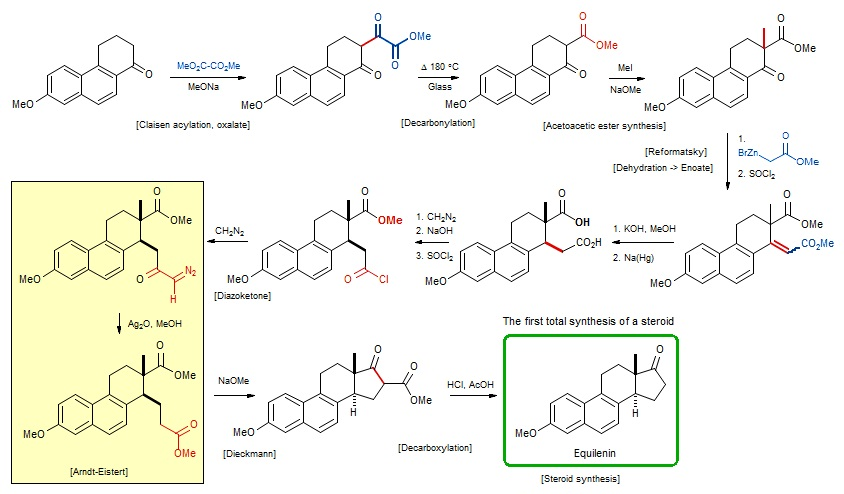

The overall yield of the synthesis was 2.7% based on a twenty-step process starting from Cleve's acid.

== See also ==
- List of estrogens § Equine estrogens
