= ERB-79 =

Chemical compound

Clinical data
- Drug class: Estrogen; Selective ERβ agonist

Identifiers
- CAS Number: 1807969-57-8
- PubChem SID: 472218944

ERB-79 is a synthetic estrogen and a selective agonist of the ERβ. It is a racemic mixture, with the active enantiomer being ERB-26. ERB-79 shows more than 484-fold selectivity for transactivation of the ERβ over the ERα. Its EC_{50} value for the ERβ is 0.448 nM (14.52% of the potency of estradiol) and for the ERα is 79 nM (0.03% of the potency of estradiol). It has no antagonistic activity at either receptor. ERB-79 is active in preclinical models of arthritis. The chemical structure of ERB-79 does not appear to have been disclosed.

== See also ==
- Diarylpropionitrile
- ERB-196
- Erteberel
- FERb 033
- Prinaberel (ERB-041)
- WAY-166818
- WAY-200070
- WAY-214156
