= ERB-26 =

Chemical compound

Clinical data
- Drug class: Estrogen; Selective ERβ agonist

ERB-26 is a synthetic estrogen and a selective agonist of the ERβ. It is the active enantiomer of the racemic mixture ERB-79. Whereas ERB-79 shows 484-fold selectivity for the ERβ over the ERα, ERB-26 differs slightly in that it is even more selective, showing greater than 1,000-fold selectivity for transactivation of the ERβ relative to the ERα. Its EC_{50} value for the ERβ is 0.21 nM (4-fold weaker than estradiol) and for the ERα is 260 nM (10,000-fold weaker than estradiol). It has no antagonistic activity at either receptor. ERB-26 is active in prevention of prostate cancer development in preclinical models. In contrast to ERB-26, the selective ERα agonist ERA-45 induced prostate cancer development in preclinical models when it was given in combination with testosterone, whereas testosterone alone did not do so. These findings suggest opposing roles of the ERα and ERβ in the prostate gland. The chemical structure of ERB-26 does not appear to have been disclosed.

== See also ==
- Diarylpropionitrile
- ERB-196
- Erteberel
- FERb 033
- Prinaberel (ERB-041)
- WAY-166818
- WAY-200070
- WAY-214156
