= SERBA-2 =

Chemical compound

Clinical data
- Other names: (2S,3R,4S)-SERBA

Identifiers
- IUPAC name: (3aR,4S,9bS)-4-(4-Hydroxyphenyl)-1,2,3,3a,4,9b-hexahydrocyclopenta[c]chromen-8-ol
- CAS Number: 533884-10-5
- PubChem CID: 9925763
- ChemSpider: 8101398
- ChEMBL: ChEMBL216355
- CompTox Dashboard (EPA): DTXSID901337093

Chemical and physical data
- Formula: C_{18}H_{18}O_{3}
- Molar mass: 282.339 g·mol^{−1}
- 3D model (JSmol): Interactive image
- SMILES: C1C[C@@H]2[C@H](C1)C3=C(C=CC(=C3)O)O[C@@H]2C4=CC=C(C=C4)O
- InChI: InChI=1S/C18H18O3/c19-12-6-4-11(5-7-12)18-15-3-1-2-14(15)16-10-13(20)8-9-17(16)21-18/h4-10,14-15,18-20H,1-3H2/t14-,15+,18+/m0/s1; Key:XIESSJVMWNJCGZ-HDMKZQKVSA-N

SERBA-2, short for selective estrogen receptor beta agonist-2, is a synthetic, nonsteroidal estrogen which acts as a selective ERβ agonist. For the ERα and ERβ, SERBA-2 has affinities (K_{i}) of 14.5 nM and 1.54 nM, efficacies of 85% and 100%, and EC_{50} values of 85 nM and 3.61 nM, respectively, demonstrating 9-fold binding selectivity and 11-fold functional selectivity for the ERβ over the ERα. An enantiomer of SERBA-2, erteberel (SERBA-1), is more potent and selective in comparison and is under development for the treatment of schizophrenia.

== See also ==
- 8β-VE2
- Diarylpropionitrile
- ERB-196
- Prinaberel
- WAY-200070
