= (R,R)-Tetrahydrochrysene =

Chemical compound

Identifiers
- IUPAC name: (5R,11R)-5,11-Diethyl-5,6,11,12-tetrahydrochrysene-2,8-diol
- CAS Number: 138090-06-9
- PubChem CID: 446849
- ChemSpider: 394097
- UNII: 89HTC2NWF3
- ChEBI: CHEBI:42371

Chemical and physical data
- Formula: C_{22}H_{24}O_{2}
- Molar mass: 320.432 g·mol^{−1}
- 3D model (JSmol): Interactive image
- SMILES: CCC1CC2=C(C=CC(=C2)O)C3=C1C4=C(CC3CC)C=C(C=C4)O
- InChI: InChI=1S/C22H24O2/c1-3-13-9-15-11-17(23)6-8-20(15)22-14(4-2)10-16-12-18(24)5-7-19(16)21(13)22/h5-8,11-14,23-24H,3-4,9-10H2,1-2H3/t13-,14-/m1/s1; Key:MASYAWHPJCQLSW-ZIAGYGMSSA-N

(R,R)-Tetrahydrochrysene ((R,R)-THC) is a drug used to study the estrogen receptors (ERs) in scientific research. It is an ERβ antagonist and an ERα agonist with 10-fold higher affinity for ERβ relative to ERα. (R,R)-THC is a silent antagonist of ERβ, and, uniquely relative to other known ERβ antagonists, a passive antagonist of the receptor.

(S,S)-Tetrahydrochrysene ((S,S)-THC) also binds to the ERs, but in contrast to (R,R)-THC, (S,S)-THC is an agonist of both ERα and ERβ and has 20-fold lower affinity for ERβ relative to (R,R)-THC.

== See also ==
- Propylpyrazoletriol (PPT)
- PHTPP
- Methylpiperidinopyrazole (MPP)
- Diarylpropionitrile (DPN)
- Prinaberel (ERB-041)
- Liquiritigenin
- Menerba
- 2,8-DHHHC
- Chrysene
