= PHTPP =

Chemical compound

Identifiers
- IUPAC name: 4-[2-Phenyl-5,7-bis(trifluoromethyl)pyrazolo[1,5-a]pyrimidin-3-yl]phenol
- CAS Number: 805239-56-9
- PubChem CID: 11201035
- ChemSpider: 9376104
- UNII: NN82CVN36N
- CompTox Dashboard (EPA): DTXSID10458573

Chemical and physical data
- Formula: C_{20}H_{11}F_{6}N_{3}O
- Molar mass: 423.318 g·mol^{−1}
- 3D model (JSmol): Interactive image
- SMILES: C1=CC=C(C=C1)C2=NN3C(=CC(=NC3=C2C4=CC=C(C=C4)O)C(F)(F)F)C(F)(F)F
- InChI: InChI=1S/C20H11F6N3O/c21-19(22,23)14-10-15(20(24,25)26)29-18(27-14)16(11-6-8-13(30)9-7-11)17(28-29)12-4-2-1-3-5-12/h1-10,30H; Key:AEZPAUSGTAHLOQ-UHFFFAOYSA-N

PHTPP is a synthetic, nonsteroidal, and highly selective antagonist of ERβ that is used in scientific research to study the function of this receptor. It possesses 36-fold selectivity for ERβ over ERα, and is a silent antagonist of ERβ.

== See also ==
- Propylpyrazoletriol (PPT)
- Methylpiperidinopyrazole (MPP)
- (R,R)-Tetrahydrochrysene ((R,R)-THC)
- Diarylpropionitrile (DPN)
- Prinaberel (ERB-041)
- Liquiritigenin
- Menerba
- WAY-200070
