= Liquiritigenin =

Names
- IUPAC name (2S)-4′,7-Dihydroxyflavan-4-one
- Systematic IUPAC name (2S)-7-Hydroxy-2-(4-hydroxyphenyl)-2,3-dihydro-4H-1-benzopyran-4-one

Identifiers
| CAS Number | 578-86-9 |
| 3D model (JSmol) | Interactive image |
| ChEBI | CHEBI:28777 |
| ChEMBL | ChEMBL252642 |
| ChemSpider | 102790 |
| KEGG | C09762 |
| PubChem CID | 114829 |
| UNII | T194LKP9W6 |
| CompTox Dashboard (EPA) | DTXSID90206493 |
- InChI: InChI=1S/C15H12O4/c16-10-3-1-9(2-4-10)14-8-13(18)12-6-5-11(17)7-15(12)19-14/h1-7,14,16-17H,8H2/t14-/m0/s1 Key: FURUXTVZLHCCNA-AWEZNQCLSA-N; InChI=1/C15H12O4/c16-10-3-1-9(2-4-10)14-8-13(18)12-6-5-11(17)7-15(12)19-14/h1-7,14,16-17H,8H2/t14-/m0/s1 Key: FURUXTVZLHCCNA-AWEZNQCLBC
- SMILES: O=C2c3c(O[C@H](c1ccc(O)cc1)C2)cc(O)cc3

Properties
| Chemical formula | C_{15}H_{12}O_{4} |
| Molar mass | 256.257 g·mol^{−1} |
- Except where otherwise noted, data are given for materials in their standard state (at 25 °C [77 °F], 100 kPa). Infobox references

Liquiritigenin is a flavanone that was isolated from Glycyrrhiza uralensis, and is found in a variety of plants of the Glycyrrhiza genus, including Glycyrrhiza glabra (licorice). It is an estrogenic compound which acts as a selective agonist of the ERβ subtype of the estrogen receptor (ER), though it is also reported to act as an ERα partial agonist at sufficient concentrations. It also has a choleretic effect.

Liquiritigenin,NADPH:oxygen oxidoreductase (hydroxylating, aryl migration) is an enzyme that uses liquiritigenin, O_{2}, NADPH and H^{+} to produce 2,7,4'-trihydroxyisoflavanone, H_{2}O, and NADP^{+}.

== See also ==
- Menerba
- Prinaberel (ERB-041)
- Diarylpropionitrile (DPN)
- WAY-200070
- PHTPP
- (R,R)-Tetrahydrochrysene ((R,R)-THC)
- Propylpyrazoletriol (PPT)
- Methylpiperidinopyrazole (MPP)
