= C22H24O2 =

The molecular formula C_{22}H_{24}O_{2} may refer to:

- (R,R)-Tetrahydrochrysene, a drug used to study estrogen receptors in scientific research
- (S,S)-Tetrahydrochrysene, a steroid-like nonsteroidal estrogen and agonist of both the estrogen receptors
