= Estrogen receptor =

Proteins activated by the hormone estrogen

estrogen receptor 1 (ER-alpha)
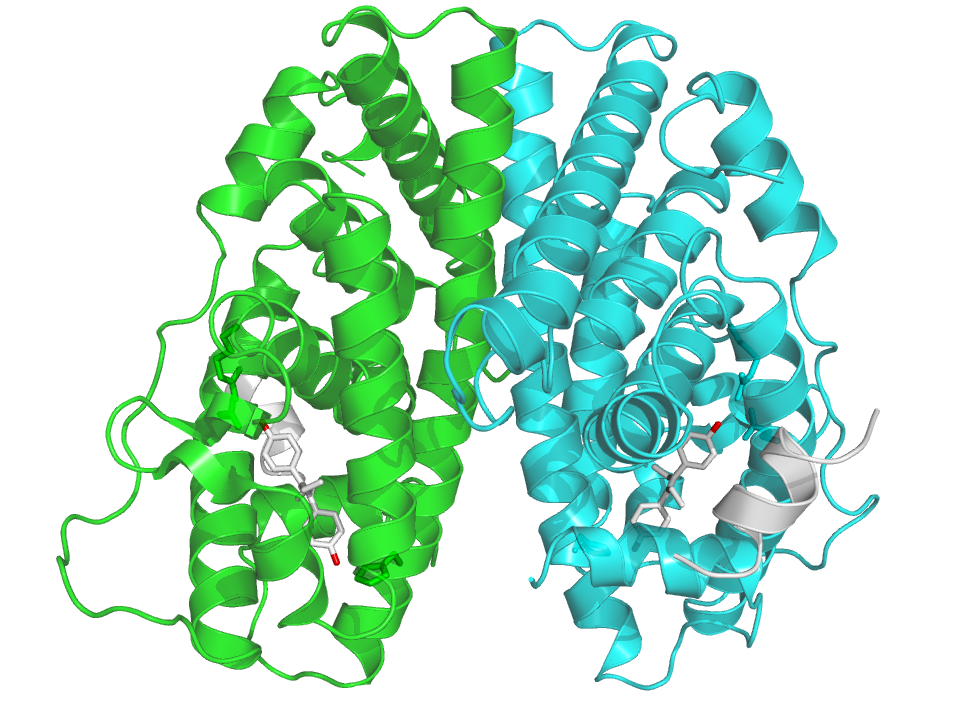
- A dimer of the ligand-binding region of ERα (PDB rendering based on 3erd).

Identifiers
- Symbol: ESR1
- Alt. symbols: ER-α, NR3A1
- NCBI gene: 2099
- HGNC: 3467
- OMIM: 133430
- PDB: 1ERE
- RefSeq: NM_000125
- UniProt: P03372

Other data
- Locus: Chr. 6 q24-q27
Search for
- Structures: Swiss-model
- Domains: InterPro

estrogen receptor 2 (ER-beta)
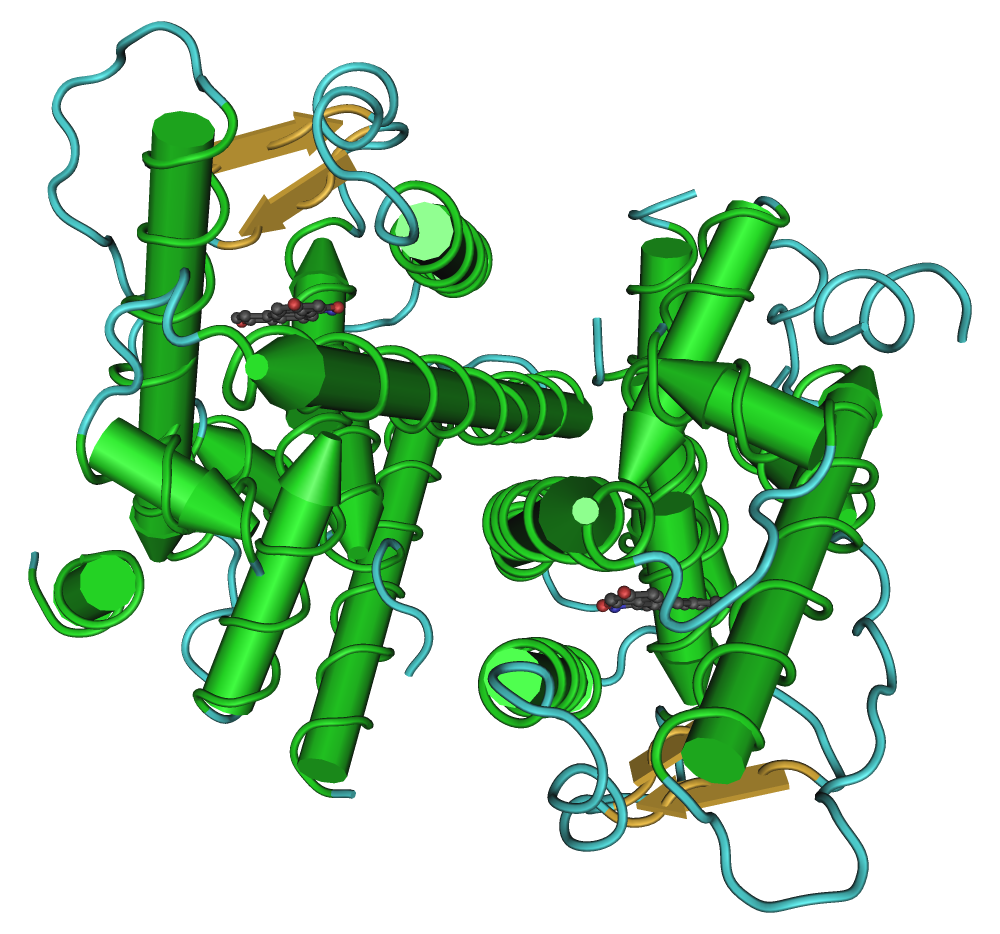
- A dimer of the ligand-binding region of ERβ (PDB rendering based on 1u3s).

Identifiers
- Symbol: ESR2
- Alt. symbols: ER-β, NR3A2
- NCBI gene: 2100
- HGNC: 3468
- OMIM: 601663
- PDB: 1QKM
- RefSeq: NM_001040275
- UniProt: Q92731

Other data
- Locus: Chr. 14 q21-q22
Search for
- Structures: Swiss-model
- Domains: InterPro

Estrogen receptors (ERs) are proteins found in cells that function as receptors for the hormone estrogen (17β-estradiol). There are two main classes of ERs. The first includes the intracellular estrogen receptors, namely ERα and ERβ, which belong to the nuclear receptor family. The second class consists of membrane estrogen receptors (mERs), such as GPER (GPR30), ER-X, and G_{q}-mER, which are primarily G protein-coupled receptors. This article focuses on the nuclear estrogen receptors (ERα and ERβ).

Upon activation by estrogen, intracellular ERs undergo translocation to the nucleus where they bind to specific DNA sequences. As DNA-binding transcription factors, they regulate the activity of various genes. However, ERs also exhibit functions that are independent of their DNA-binding capacity. These non-genomic actions contribute to the diverse effects of estrogen signaling in cells.

Estrogen receptors (ERs) belong to the family of steroid hormone receptors, which are hormone receptors for sex steroids. Along with androgen receptors (ARs) and progesterone receptors (PRs), ERs play crucial roles in regulating sexual maturation and gestation. These receptors mediate the effects of their respective hormones, contributing to the development and maintenance of reproductive functions and secondary sexual characteristics.

== Genes ==
In humans, the two forms of the estrogen receptor are encoded by different genes, ESR1 and ESR2 on the sixth and fourteenth chromosome (6q25.1 and 14q23.2), respectively.

== Structure ==
The domain structures of ERα and ERβ, including some of the known phosphorylation sites involved in ligand-independent regulation.

Estrogen receptor alpha N-terminal AF1 domain

Identifiers
- Symbol: Oest_recep
- Pfam: PF02159
- InterPro: IPR001292
- SCOP2: 1hcp / SCOPe / SUPFAM
Available protein structures:
- PDB: IPR001292 PF02159 (ECOD; PDBsum)
- AlphaFold: IPR001292; PF02159

Estrogen and estrogen related receptor C-terminal domain

Identifiers
- Symbol: ESR1_C
- Pfam: PF12743
Available protein structures:
- PDB: PF12743 (ECOD; PDBsum)
- AlphaFold: PF12743

There are two different forms of the estrogen receptor, usually referred to as α and β, each encoded by a separate gene (ESR1 and ESR2, respectively). Hormone-activated estrogen receptors form dimers, and, since the two forms are coexpressed in many cell types, the receptors may form ERα (αα) or ERβ (ββ) homodimers or ERαβ (αβ) heterodimers. Estrogen receptor alpha and beta show significant overall sequence homology, and both are composed of five domains designated A/B through F (listed from the N- to C-terminus; amino acid sequence numbers refer to human ER).

The N-terminal A/B domain is structurally disordered and is able to transactivate gene transcription in the absence of bound ligand (e.g., the estrogen hormone). The C domain, also known as the DNA-binding domain, binds to estrogen response elements in DNA. The D domain is a hinge region that connects the C and E domains. The E domain contains the ligand binding cavity as well as binding sites for coactivator and corepressor proteins. The E-domain in the presence of bound ligand is able to activate gene transcription. The C-terminal F domain function is not entirely clear and is variable in length.

Due to alternative RNA splicing, several ER isoforms are known to exist. At least three ERα and five ERβ isoforms have been identified. The ERβ isoforms receptor subtypes can transactivate transcription only when a heterodimer with the functional ERß1 receptor of 59 kDa is formed. The ERß3 receptor was detected at high levels in the testis. The two other ERα isoforms are 36 and 46kDa.

Only in fish, but not in humans, an ERγ receptor has been described.

== Tissue distribution ==
Both ERs are widely expressed in different tissue types, however there are some notable differences in their expression patterns:

- The ERα is found in endometrium, breast cancer cells, ovarian stromal cells, and the hypothalamus. In males, ERα protein is found in the epithelium of the efferent ducts.
- The expression of the ERβ protein has been documented in ovarian granulosa cells, kidney, brain, bone, heart, lungs, intestinal mucosa, prostate, and endothelial cells.

The ERs are regarded to be cytoplasmic receptors in their unliganded state, but visualization research has shown that only a small fraction of the ERs reside in the cytoplasm, with most ER constitutively in the nucleus. The "ERα" primary transcript gives rise to several alternatively spliced variants of unknown function.

== Signal transduction ==
Since estrogen is a steroidal hormone, it can readily diffuse through the phospholipid membranes of cells due to its lipophilic nature. As a result, estrogen receptors can be located intracellularly and do not necessarily need to be membrane-bound to interact with estrogen. However, both intracellular and membrane-bound estrogen receptors exist, each mediating different cellular responses to estrogen.

=== Genomic ===
In the absence of hormone, estrogen receptors are predominantly located in the cytoplasm. Hormone binding triggers a series of events, beginning with the migration of the receptor from the cytoplasm to the nucleus. This is followed by the dimerization of the receptor, where two receptor molecules join together. Finally, the receptor dimer binds to specific DNA sequences known as hormone response elements, initiating the process of gene regulation.

The DNA/receptor complex then recruits other proteins responsible for transcription of downstream DNA into mRNA and ultimately protein, resulting in changes in cell function. Estrogen receptors are also present within the cell nucleus, and both estrogen receptor subtypes (ERα and ERβ) contain a DNA-binding domain, allowing them to function as transcription factors regulating protein production.

The receptor also interacts with transcription factors such as activator protein 1 and Sp-1 to promote transcription, via several coactivators including PELP-1. Tumor suppressor kinase LKB1 coactivates ERα in the cell nucleus through direct binding, recruiting it to the promoter of ERα-responsive genes. LKB1's catalytic activity enhances ERα transactivation compared to catalytically deficient LKB1 mutants. Direct acetylation of estrogen receptor alpha at lysine residues in the hinge region by p300 regulates transactivation and hormone sensitivity.

=== Non-genomic ===
Nuclear estrogen receptors can also associate with the cell surface membrane and undergo rapid activation upon cellular exposure to estrogen.

Some ERs interact with cell membranes by binding to caveolin-1 and forming complexes with G proteins, striatin, receptor tyrosine kinases (e.g., EGFR and IGF-1), and non-receptor tyrosine kinases (e.g., Src). Membrane-bound ERs associated with striatin can increase levels of Ca^{2+} and nitric oxide (NO). Interactions with receptor tyrosine kinases trigger signaling to the nucleus via the mitogen-activated protein kinase (MAPK/ERK) and phosphoinositide 3-kinase (Pl3K/AKT) pathways.

Glycogen synthase kinase-3 (GSK)-3β inhibits nuclear ER transcription by preventing phosphorylation of serine 118 on nuclear ERα. The PI3K/AKT and MAPK/ERK pathways can phosphorylate GSK-3β, thereby removing its inhibitory effect, with the latter pathway acting via rsk.

17β-Estradiol has been shown to activate the G protein-coupled receptor GPR30. However, the subcellular localization and precise role of this receptor remain controversial.

== Clinical significance ==
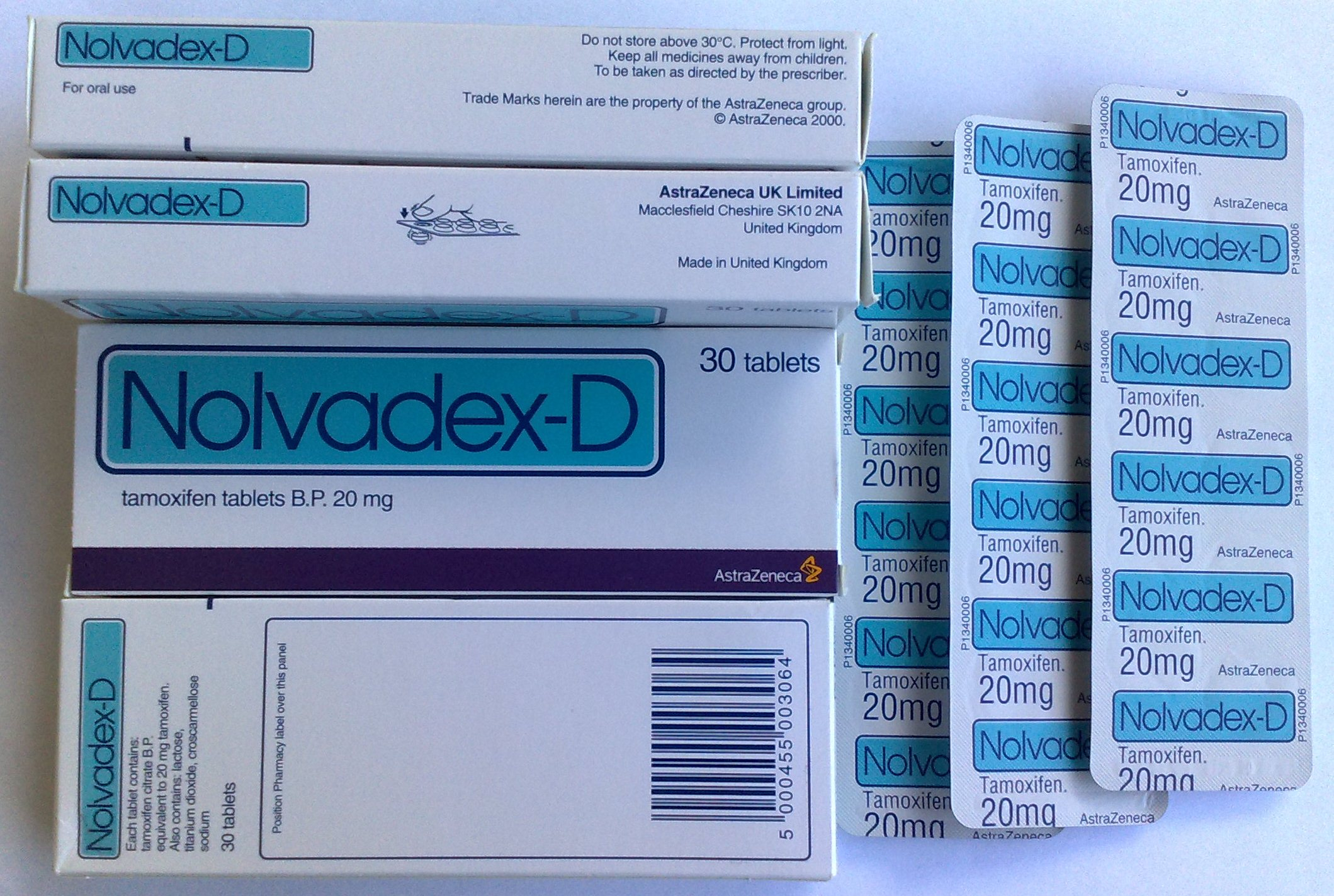
Nolvadex (tamoxifen) 20 mg

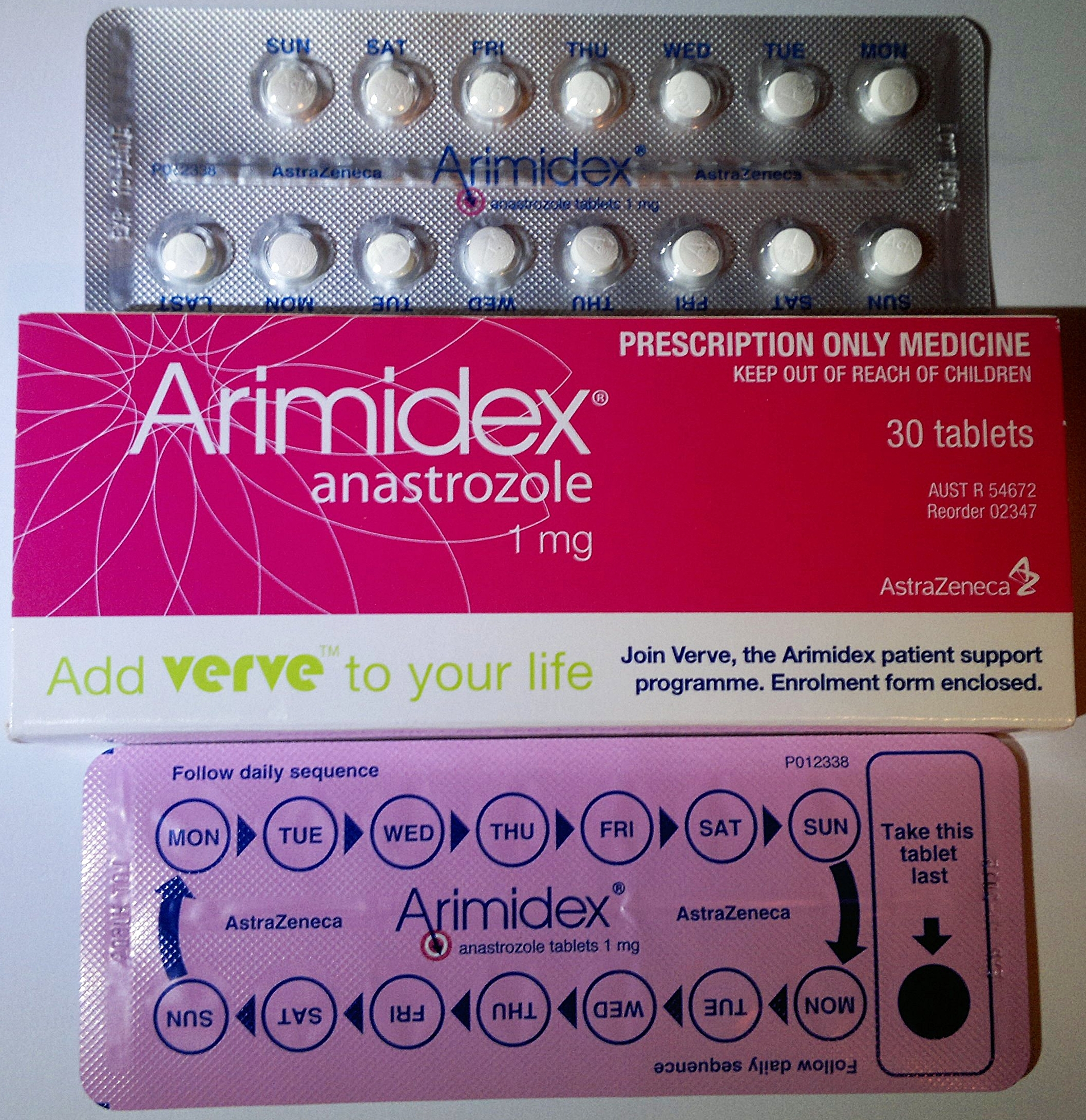
Arimidex (anastrozole) 1 mg

=== Cancer ===
Estrogen receptors are over-expressed in around 70% of breast cancer cases, referred to as "ER-positive", and can be demonstrated in such tissues using immunohistochemistry or radio-ligand binding assay which quantifies these receptor proteins. Two hypotheses have been proposed to explain why this causes tumorigenesis, and the available evidence suggests that both mechanisms contribute:

- First, binding of estrogen to the ER stimulates proliferation of mammary cells, with the resulting increase in cell division and DNA replication, leading to mutations.
- Second, estrogen metabolism produces genotoxic waste.

The result of both processes is disruption of cell cycle, apoptosis and DNA repair, which increases the chance of tumour formation. ERα is certainly associated with more differentiated tumours, while evidence that ERβ is involved is controversial. Different versions of the ESR1 gene have been identified (with single-nucleotide polymorphisms) and are associated with different risks of developing breast cancer.

Estrogen and the standardized ER tests as developed by New England Nuclear and Wittliff, have also been implicated in breast cancer, ovarian cancer, colon cancer, prostate cancer, and endometrial cancer. Advanced colon cancer is associated with a loss of ERβ, the predominant ER in colon tissue, and colon cancer is treated with ERβ-specific agonists.

Endocrine therapy for breast cancer involves selective estrogen receptor modulators (SERMS), such as tamoxifen, which behave as ER antagonists in breast tissue, or aromatase inhibitors, such as anastrozole. ER status is used to determine sensitivity of breast cancer lesions to tamoxifen and aromatase inhibitors. Another SERM, raloxifene, has been used as a preventive chemotherapy for women judged to have a high risk of developing breast cancer. Another chemotherapeutic anti-estrogen, ICI 182,780 (Faslodex), which acts as a complete antagonist, also promotes degradation of the estrogen receptor.

However, de novo resistance to endocrine therapy undermines the efficacy of using competitive inhibitors like tamoxifen. Hormone deprivation through the use of aromatase inhibitors is also rendered futile. Massively parallel genome sequencing has revealed the common presence of point mutations on ESR1 that are drivers for resistance, and promote the agonist conformation of ERα without the bound ligand. Such constitutive, estrogen-independent activity is driven by specific mutations, such as the D538G or Y537S/C/N mutations, in the ligand binding domain of ESR1 and promote cell proliferation and tumor progression without hormone stimulation.

=== Menopause ===
The metabolic effects of estrogen in postmenopausal women has been linked to the genetic polymorphism of estrogen receptor beta (ER-β).

=== Aging ===
Studies in female mice have shown that estrogen receptor-alpha declines in the pre-optic hypothalamus as they grow old. Female mice that were given a calorically restricted diet during the majority of their lives maintained higher levels of ERα in the pre-optic hypothalamus than their non-calorically restricted counterparts.

=== Obesity ===
A dramatic demonstration of the importance of estrogens in the regulation of fat deposition comes from transgenic mice that were genetically engineered to lack a functional aromatase gene. These mice have very low levels of estrogen and are obese. Obesity was also observed in estrogen deficient female mice lacking the follicle-stimulating hormone receptor. The effect of low estrogen on increased obesity has been linked to estrogen receptor alpha.

=== Serms for other treatment purposes ===
SERMs are also being studied for the treatment of uterine fibroids and endometriosis. The evidence supporting the use of SERMs for treating uterine fibroids (reduction in size of fibroids and improving other clinical outcomes) is inconclusive and more research is needed. It is also not clear if SERMs is effective for treating endometriosis.

=== Estrogen insensitivity syndrome ===
Estrogen insensitivity syndrome is a rare intersex condition with 5 reported cases, in which estrogen receptors do not function. The phenotype results in extensive masculinization. Unlike androgen insensitivity syndrome, EIS does not result in phenotype sex reversal. It is incredibly rare and is analogous to the AIS, and forms of adrenal hyperplasia. The reason why AIS is common and EIS is exceptionally rare is that XX AIS does not result in infertility, and therefore can be maternally inherited, while EIS always results in infertility regardless of karyotype. A negative feedback loop between the endocrine system also occurs in EIS, in which the gonads produce markedly higher levels of estrogen for individuals with EIS (119–272 pg/mL XY and 750–3,500 pg/mL XX, see average levels) however no feminizing effects occur.

== Ligands ==
=== Agonists ===
- Endogenous estrogens (e.g., estradiol, estrone, estriol, estetrol)
- Natural estrogens (e.g., conjugated estrogens)
- Synthetic estrogens (e.g., ethinylestradiol, diethylstilbestrol)

=== Mixed (agonist and antagonist mode of action) ===
- Phytoestrogens (e.g., coumestrol, daidzein, genistein, miroestrol)
- Selective estrogen receptor modulators (e.g., tamoxifen, clomifene, raloxifene)

=== Antagonists ===
- Antiestrogens (e.g., fulvestrant, ICI-164384, ethamoxytriphetol)

=== Affinities ===
Affinities of estrogen receptor ligands for the ERα and ERβ
Ligand	Other names	Relative binding affinities (RBA, %)^{a}		Absolute binding affinities (K_{i}, nM)^{a}		Action
Ligand	Other names	ERα	ERβ	ERα	ERβ	Action
Estradiol	E2; 17β-Estradiol	100	100	0.115 (0.04–0.24)	0.15 (0.10–2.08)	Estrogen
Estrone	E1; 17-Ketoestradiol	16.39 (0.7–60)	6.5 (1.36–52)	0.445 (0.3–1.01)	1.75 (0.35–9.24)	Estrogen
Estriol	E3; 16α-OH-17β-E2	12.65 (4.03–56)	26 (14.0–44.6)	0.45 (0.35–1.4)	0.7 (0.63–0.7)	Estrogen
Estetrol	E4; 15α,16α-Di-OH-17β-E2	4.0	3.0	4.9	19	Estrogen
Alfatradiol	17α-Estradiol	20.5 (7–80.1)	8.195 (2–42)	0.2–0.52	0.43–1.2	Metabolite
16-Epiestriol	16β-Hydroxy-17β-estradiol	7.795 (4.94–63)	50	?	?	Metabolite
17-Epiestriol	16α-Hydroxy-17α-estradiol	55.45 (29–103)	79–80	?	?	Metabolite
16,17-Epiestriol	16β-Hydroxy-17α-estradiol	1.0	13	?	?	Metabolite
2-Hydroxyestradiol	2-OH-E2	22 (7–81)	11–35	2.5	1.3	Metabolite
2-Methoxyestradiol	2-MeO-E2	0.0027–2.0	1.0	?	?	Metabolite
4-Hydroxyestradiol	4-OH-E2	13 (8–70)	7–56	1.0	1.9	Metabolite
4-Methoxyestradiol	4-MeO-E2	2.0	1.0	?	?	Metabolite
2-Hydroxyestrone	2-OH-E1	2.0–4.0	0.2–0.4	?	?	Metabolite
2-Methoxyestrone	2-MeO-E1	<0.001–<1	<1	?	?	Metabolite
4-Hydroxyestrone	4-OH-E1	1.0–2.0	1.0	?	?	Metabolite
4-Methoxyestrone	4-MeO-E1	<1	<1	?	?	Metabolite
16α-Hydroxyestrone	16α-OH-E1; 17-Ketoestriol	2.0–6.5	35	?	?	Metabolite
2-Hydroxyestriol	2-OH-E3	2.0	1.0	?	?	Metabolite
4-Methoxyestriol	4-MeO-E3	1.0	1.0	?	?	Metabolite
Estradiol sulfate	E2S; Estradiol 3-sulfate	<1	<1	?	?	Metabolite
Estradiol disulfate	Estradiol 3,17β-disulfate	0.0004	?	?	?	Metabolite
Estradiol 3-glucuronide	E2-3G	0.0079	?	?	?	Metabolite
Estradiol 17β-glucuronide	E2-17G	0.0015	?	?	?	Metabolite
Estradiol 3-gluc. 17β-sulfate	E2-3G-17S	0.0001	?	?	?	Metabolite
Estrone sulfate	E1S; Estrone 3-sulfate	<1	<1	>10	>10	Metabolite
Estradiol benzoate	EB; Estradiol 3-benzoate	10	?	?	?	Estrogen
Estradiol 17β-benzoate	E2-17B	11.3	32.6	?	?	Estrogen
Estrone methyl ether	Estrone 3-methyl ether	0.145	?	?	?	Estrogen
ent-Estradiol	1-Estradiol	1.31–12.34	9.44–80.07	?	?	Estrogen
Equilin	7-Dehydroestrone	13 (4.0–28.9)	13.0–49	0.79	0.36	Estrogen
Equilenin	6,8-Didehydroestrone	2.0–15	7.0–20	0.64	0.62	Estrogen
17β-Dihydroequilin	7-Dehydro-17β-estradiol	7.9–113	7.9–108	0.09	0.17	Estrogen
17α-Dihydroequilin	7-Dehydro-17α-estradiol	18.6 (18–41)	14–32	0.24	0.57	Estrogen
17β-Dihydroequilenin	6,8-Didehydro-17β-estradiol	35–68	90–100	0.15	0.20	Estrogen
17α-Dihydroequilenin	6,8-Didehydro-17α-estradiol	20	49	0.50	0.37	Estrogen
Δ^{8}-Estradiol	8,9-Dehydro-17β-estradiol	68	72	0.15	0.25	Estrogen
Δ^{8}-Estrone	8,9-Dehydroestrone	19	32	0.52	0.57	Estrogen
Ethinylestradiol	EE; 17α-Ethynyl-17β-E2	120.9 (68.8–480)	44.4 (2.0–144)	0.02–0.05	0.29–0.81	Estrogen
Mestranol	EE 3-methyl ether	?	2.5	?	?	Estrogen
Moxestrol	RU-2858; 11β-Methoxy-EE	35–43	5–20	0.5	2.6	Estrogen
Methylestradiol	17α-Methyl-17β-estradiol	70	44	?	?	Estrogen
Diethylstilbestrol	DES; Stilbestrol	129.5 (89.1–468)	219.63 (61.2–295)	0.04	0.05	Estrogen
Hexestrol	Dihydrodiethylstilbestrol	153.6 (31–302)	60–234	0.06	0.06	Estrogen
Dienestrol	Dehydrostilbestrol	37 (20.4–223)	56–404	0.05	0.03	Estrogen
Benzestrol (B2)	–	114	?	?	?	Estrogen
Chlorotrianisene	TACE	1.74	?	15.30	?	Estrogen
Triphenylethylene	TPE	0.074	?	?	?	Estrogen
Triphenylbromoethylene	TPBE	2.69	?	?	?	Estrogen
Tamoxifen	ICI-46,474	3 (0.1–47)	3.33 (0.28–6)	3.4–9.69	2.5	SERM
Afimoxifene	4-Hydroxytamoxifen; 4-OHT	100.1 (1.7–257)	10 (0.98–339)	2.3 (0.1–3.61)	0.04–4.8	SERM
Toremifene	4-Chlorotamoxifen; 4-CT	?	?	7.14–20.3	15.4	SERM
Clomifene	MRL-41	25 (19.2–37.2)	12	0.9	1.2	SERM
Cyclofenil	F-6066; Sexovid	151–152	243	?	?	SERM
Nafoxidine	U-11,000A	30.9–44	16	0.3	0.8	SERM
Raloxifene	–	41.2 (7.8–69)	5.34 (0.54–16)	0.188–0.52	20.2	SERM
Arzoxifene	LY-353,381	?	?	0.179	?	SERM
Lasofoxifene	CP-336,156	10.2–166	19.0	0.229	?	SERM
Ormeloxifene	Centchroman	?	?	0.313	?	SERM
Levormeloxifene	6720-CDRI; NNC-460,020	1.55	1.88	?	?	SERM
Ospemifene	Deaminohydroxytoremifene	0.82–2.63	0.59–1.22	?	?	SERM
Bazedoxifene	–	?	?	0.053	?	SERM
Etacstil	GW-5638	4.30	11.5	?	?	SERM
ICI-164,384	–	63.5 (3.70–97.7)	166	0.2	0.08	Antiestrogen
Fulvestrant	ICI-182,780	43.5 (9.4–325)	21.65 (2.05–40.5)	0.42	1.3	Antiestrogen
Propylpyrazoletriol	PPT	49 (10.0–89.1)	0.12	0.40	92.8	ERα agonist
16α-LE2	16α-Lactone-17β-estradiol	14.6–57	0.089	0.27	131	ERα agonist
16α-Iodo-E2	16α-Iodo-17β-estradiol	30.2	2.30	?	?	ERα agonist
Methylpiperidinopyrazole	MPP	11	0.05	?	?	ERα antagonist
Diarylpropionitrile	DPN	0.12–0.25	6.6–18	32.4	1.7	ERβ agonist
8β-VE2	8β-Vinyl-17β-estradiol	0.35	22.0–83	12.9	0.50	ERβ agonist
Prinaberel	ERB-041; WAY-202,041	0.27	67–72	?	?	ERβ agonist
ERB-196	WAY-202,196	?	180	?	?	ERβ agonist
Erteberel	SERBA-1; LY-500,307	?	?	2.68	0.19	ERβ agonist
SERBA-2	–	?	?	14.5	1.54	ERβ agonist
Coumestrol	–	9.225 (0.0117–94)	64.125 (0.41–185)	0.14–80.0	0.07–27.0	Xenoestrogen
Genistein	–	0.445 (0.0012–16)	33.42 (0.86–87)	2.6–126	0.3–12.8	Xenoestrogen
Equol	–	0.2–0.287	0.85 (0.10–2.85)	?	?	Xenoestrogen
Daidzein	–	0.07 (0.0018–9.3)	0.7865 (0.04–17.1)	2.0	85.3	Xenoestrogen
Biochanin A	–	0.04 (0.022–0.15)	0.6225 (0.010–1.2)	174	8.9	Xenoestrogen
Kaempferol	–	0.07 (0.029–0.10)	2.2 (0.002–3.00)	?	?	Xenoestrogen
Naringenin	–	0.0054 (<0.001–0.01)	0.15 (0.11–0.33)	?	?	Xenoestrogen
8-Prenylnaringenin	8-PN	4.4	?	?	?	Xenoestrogen
Quercetin	–	<0.001–0.01	0.002–0.040	?	?	Xenoestrogen
Ipriflavone	–	<0.01	<0.01	?	?	Xenoestrogen
Miroestrol	–	0.39	?	?	?	Xenoestrogen
Deoxymiroestrol	–	2.0	?	?	?	Xenoestrogen
β-Sitosterol	–	<0.001–0.0875	<0.001–0.016	?	?	Xenoestrogen
Resveratrol	–	<0.001–0.0032	?	?	?	Xenoestrogen
α-Zearalenol	–	48 (13–52.5)	?	?	?	Xenoestrogen
β-Zearalenol	–	0.6 (0.032–13)	?	?	?	Xenoestrogen
Zeranol	α-Zearalanol	48–111	?	?	?	Xenoestrogen
Taleranol	β-Zearalanol	16 (13–17.8)	14	0.8	0.9	Xenoestrogen
Zearalenone	ZEN	7.68 (2.04–28)	9.45 (2.43–31.5)	?	?	Xenoestrogen
Zearalanone	ZAN	0.51	?	?	?	Xenoestrogen
Bisphenol A	BPA	0.0315 (0.008–1.0)	0.135 (0.002–4.23)	195	35	Xenoestrogen
Endosulfan	EDS	<0.001–<0.01	<0.01	?	?	Xenoestrogen
Kepone	Chlordecone	0.0069–0.2	?	?	?	Xenoestrogen
o,p'-DDT	–	0.0073–0.4	?	?	?	Xenoestrogen
p,p'-DDT	–	0.03	?	?	?	Xenoestrogen
Methoxychlor	p,p'-Dimethoxy-DDT	0.01 (<0.001–0.02)	0.01–0.13	?	?	Xenoestrogen
HPTE	Hydroxychlor; p,p'-OH-DDT	1.2–1.7	?	?	?	Xenoestrogen
Testosterone	T; 4-Androstenolone	<0.0001–<0.01	<0.002–0.040	>5000	>5000	Androgen
Dihydrotestosterone	DHT; 5α-Androstanolone	0.01 (<0.001–0.05)	0.0059–0.17	221–>5000	73–1688	Androgen
Nandrolone	19-Nortestosterone; 19-NT	0.01	0.23	765	53	Androgen
Dehydroepiandrosterone	DHEA; Prasterone	0.038 (<0.001–0.04)	0.019–0.07	245–1053	163–515	Androgen
5-Androstenediol	A5; Androstenediol	6	17	3.6	0.9	Androgen
4-Androstenediol	–	0.5	0.6	23	19	Androgen
4-Androstenedione	A4; Androstenedione	<0.01	<0.01	>10000	>10000	Androgen
3α-Androstanediol	3α-Adiol	0.07	0.3	260	48	Androgen
3β-Androstanediol	3β-Adiol	3	7	6	2	Androgen
Androstanedione	5α-Androstanedione	<0.01	<0.01	>10000	>10000	Androgen
Etiocholanedione	5β-Androstanedione	<0.01	<0.01	>10000	>10000	Androgen
Methyltestosterone	17α-Methyltestosterone	<0.0001	?	?	?	Androgen
Ethinyl-3α-androstanediol	17α-Ethynyl-3α-adiol	4.0	<0.07	?	?	Estrogen
Ethinyl-3β-androstanediol	17α-Ethynyl-3β-adiol	50	5.6	?	?	Estrogen
Progesterone	P4; 4-Pregnenedione	<0.001–0.6	<0.001–0.010	?	?	Progestogen
Norethisterone	NET; 17α-Ethynyl-19-NT	0.085 (0.0015–<0.1)	0.1 (0.01–0.3)	152	1084	Progestogen
Norethynodrel	5(10)-Norethisterone	0.5 (0.3–0.7)	<0.1–0.22	14	53	Progestogen
Tibolone	7α-Methylnorethynodrel	0.5 (0.45–2.0)	0.2–0.076	?	?	Progestogen
Δ^{4}-Tibolone	7α-Methylnorethisterone	0.069–<0.1	0.027–<0.1	?	?	Progestogen
3α-Hydroxytibolone	–	2.5 (1.06–5.0)	0.6–0.8	?	?	Progestogen
3β-Hydroxytibolone	–	1.6 (0.75–1.9)	0.070–0.1	?	?	Progestogen
Footnotes: ^{a} = (1) Binding affinity values are of the format "median (range)" (# (#–#)), "range" (#–#), or "value" (#) depending on the values available. The full sets of values within the ranges can be found in the Wiki code. (2) Binding affinities were determined via displacement studies in a variety of in-vitro systems with labeled estradiol and human ERα and ERβ proteins (except the ERβ values from Kuiper et al. (1997), which are rat ERβ). Sources: See template page.

=== Binding and functional selectivity ===
The ER's helix 12 domain plays a crucial role in determining interactions with coactivators and corepressors and, therefore, the respective agonist or antagonist effect of the ligand.

Different ligands may differ in their affinity for alpha and beta isoforms of the estrogen receptor:

- estradiol binds equally well to both receptors
- estrone, and raloxifene bind preferentially to the alpha receptor
- estriol, and genistein to the beta receptor

Subtype selective estrogen receptor modulators preferentially bind to either the α- or the β-subtype of the receptor. In addition, the different estrogen receptor combinations may respond differently to various ligands, which may translate into tissue selective agonistic and antagonistic effects. The ratio of α- to β- subtype concentration has been proposed to play a role in certain diseases.

The concept of selective estrogen receptor modulators is based on the ability to promote ER interactions with different proteins such as transcriptional coactivator or corepressors. Furthermore, the ratio of coactivator to corepressor protein varies in different tissues. As a consequence, the same ligand may be an agonist in some tissue (where coactivators predominate) while antagonistic in other tissues (where corepressors dominate). Tamoxifen, for example, is an antagonist in breast and is, therefore, used as a breast cancer treatment but an ER agonist in bone (thereby preventing osteoporosis) and a partial agonist in the endometrium (increasing the risk of uterine cancer).

== Discovery ==
Estrogen receptors were first identified by Elwood V. Jensen at the University of Chicago in 1958, for which Jensen was awarded the Lasker Award. The gene for a second estrogen receptor (ERβ) was identified in 1996 by Kuiper et al. in rat prostate and ovary using degenerate ERalpha primers.

== See also ==
- Membrane estrogen receptor
- Estrogen insensitivity syndrome
- Aromatase deficiency
- Aromatase excess syndrome
