= Methylpiperidinopyrazole =

Chemical compound

Identifiers
- IUPAC name: 4-[2-(4-hydroxyphenyl)-4-methyl-3-[4-(2-piperidin-1-ylethoxy)phenyl]-1H-pyrazol-5-ylidene]cyclohexa-2,5-dien-1-one
- CAS Number: 289726-02-9
- PubChem CID: 6604927
- ChemSpider: 5037183
- UNII: GNC6T7K8P2

Chemical and physical data
- Formula: C_{29}H_{31}N_{3}O_{3}
- Molar mass: 469.585 g·mol^{−1}
- 3D model (JSmol): Interactive image
- SMILES: CC1=C(N(NC1=C2C=CC(=O)C=C2)C3=CC=C(C=C3)O)C4=CC=C(C=C4)OCCN5CCCCC5
- InChI: InChI=1S/C29H31N3O3/c1-21-28(22-5-11-25(33)12-6-22)30-32(24-9-13-26(34)14-10-24)29(21)23-7-15-27(16-8-23)35-20-19-31-17-3-2-4-18-31/h5-16,30,34H,2-4,17-20H2,1H3; Key:PFTIONINVMINHE-UHFFFAOYSA-N

Methylpiperidinopyrazole (MPP) is a synthetic, nonsteroidal, and highly selective antagonist of ERα that is used in scientific research to study the function of this receptor. It has 200-fold selectivity for ERα over ERβ and 1000-fold selectivity for blocking ERα-mediated gene transcription relative to that of ERβ.

== See also ==
- Glyceollin
- Propylpyrazoletriol (PPT)
- Diarylpropionitrile (DPN)
- Prinaberel (ERB-041)
- Liquiritigenin
- Menerba
- PHTPP
- (R,R)-Tetrahydrochrysene ((R,R)-THC)
