= (S,S)-Tetrahydrochrysene =

Chemical compound

Clinical data
- Other names: (S,S)-THC

Identifiers
- IUPAC name: (S,S)-5,11-Diethyl-5,6,11,12-tetrahydro-2,8-chrysenediol
- CAS Number: 221368-54-3
- PubChem CID: 10087373
- ChemSpider: 8262910
- UNII: JDD6B8E8CW
- ChEMBL: ChEMBL312636

Chemical and physical data
- Formula: C_{22}H_{24}O_{2}
- Molar mass: 320.432 g·mol^{−1}
- 3D model (JSmol): Interactive image
- SMILES: CC[C@H]1CC2=C(C=CC(=C2)O)C3=C1C4=C(C[C@@H]3CC)C=C(C=C4)O
- InChI: InChI=1S/C22H24O2/c1-3-13-9-15-11-17(23)6-8-20(15)22-14(4-2)10-16-12-18(24)5-7-19(16)21(13)22/h5-8,11-14,23-24H,3-4,9-10H2,1-2H3/t13-,14-/m0/s1; Key:MASYAWHPJCQLSW-KBPBESRZSA-N

(S,S)-Tetrahydrochrysene ((S,S)-THC) is a steroid-like nonsteroidal estrogen and agonist of both the estrogen receptors, ERα and ERβ. It is an enantiomer of (R,R)-tetrahydrochrysene ((R,R)-THC), which, in contrast, is an ERβ silent antagonist and ERα agonist with 10-fold selectivity (i.e., affinity) for the ERβ over the ERα and with 20-fold greater affinity for the ERβ relative to that of (S,S)-THC.

== See also ==
- 2,8-DHHHC
- Chrysene
