= TEB =

TEB may refer to:

- Teterboro Airport, a general aviation airport in New Jersey, US
- Taxable equivalent basis, a banking term
- Code for Tebet railway station, in Jakarta, Indonesia
- Terminal end bud, a structure of the mammary gland
- Third Eye Blind, an alternative rock band
- The Easy Button, an alternative rock band
- Thoracic electrical bioimpedance
- Win32 Thread Information Block (also called the Thread Environment Block), a data structure used in Microsoft Windows
- Tønsberg–Eidsfoss Line, a railway in Norway
- Transit Explore Bus, a proposed straddling bus concept
- Triethylborane, a chemical used to ignite rocket motors and jet afterburners, and to initiate chemical reactions
- Türk Ekonomi Bankası, a Turkish bank
- Trophée Eric Bompard, a figure skating competition
