= FERb 033 =

Chemical compound

Identifiers
- IUPAC name: 2-Chloro-3′-fluoro-3,4′-dihydroxy-[1,1-biphenyl]-4-carboxaldehyde oxime
- CAS Number: 1111084-78-6
- ChemSpider: 24606020
- UNII: 9FUT9FH3EX
- CompTox Dashboard (EPA): DTXSID401045277

Chemical and physical data
- Formula: C_{13}H_{9}ClFNO_{3}
- Molar mass: 281.67 g·mol^{−1}
- 3D model (JSmol): Interactive image
- SMILES: c1cc(c(cc1c2ccc(c(c2Cl)O)/C=N/O)F)O
- InChI: InChI=1S/C13H9ClFNO3/c14-12-9(3-1-8(6-16-19)13(12)18)7-2-4-11(17)10(15)5-7/h1-6,17-19H/b16-6+; Key:LRRMQNGSYOUANY-OMCISZLKSA-N

FERb 033 is a synthetic, nonsteroidal estrogen that was synthesized in 2009 and is used in scientific research. It is a potent and selective ERβ agonist (K_{i} = 7.1 nM, EC_{50} = 4.8 nM), with 62-fold selectivity for the ERβ over the ERα.

== See also ==
- 8β-VE2
- Diarylpropionitrile
- ERB-196
- Erteberel
- Prinaberel
- WAY-166818
- WAY-200070
- WAY-214156
