= Rimostil =

Dietary supplement

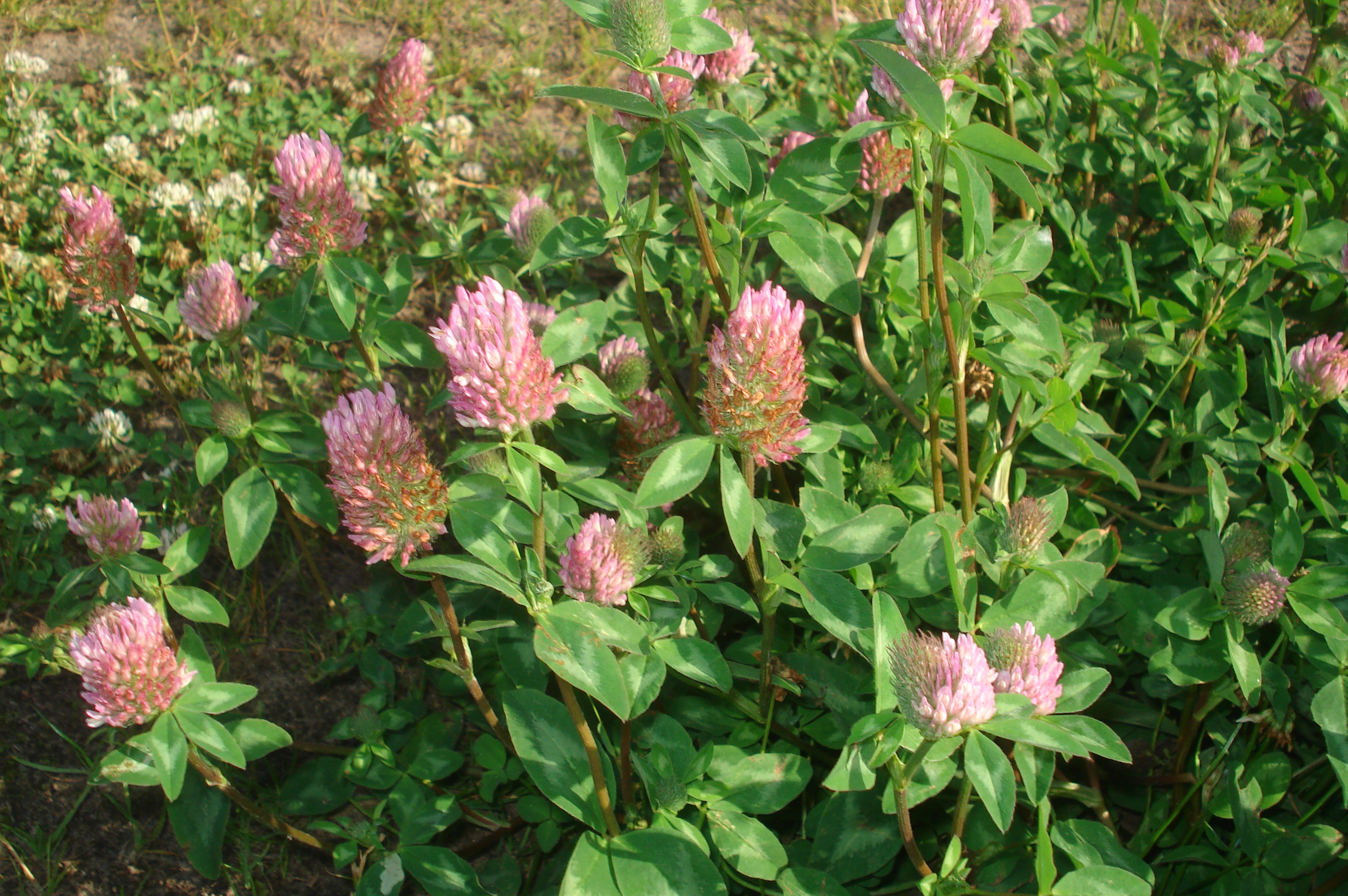
Red clover.

Rimostil (developmental code name P-081) is a dietary supplement and extract of isoflavones from red clover which was under development by Kazia Therapeutics (formerly Novogen) for the prevention of postmenopausal osteoporosis and cardiovascular disease and for the treatment of menopausal symptoms and hyperlipidemia but was never approved for medical use. It is enriched with isoflavone phytoestrogens such as formononetin, biochanin A, daidzein, and genistein, and is proposed to act as a selective estrogen receptor modulator, with both estrogenic and antiestrogenic effects in different tissues. The extract reached phase II clinical trials for cardiovascular disorders, hyperlipidemia, and postmenopausal osteoporosis prior to the discontinuation of its development in 2007.

== See also ==
- Femarelle
- Menerba
