= C15H20O4 =

The molecular formula C_{15}H_{20}O_{4} may refer to:

- Abscisic acid, a plant hormone
- DCW234, a synthetic nonsteroidal estrogen and a selective agonist of the ERβ
- Psilostachyin C
- Santonic acid, an organic compound containing both carboxylic acid and ketone functionality
