= 8β-VE2 =

Chemical compound

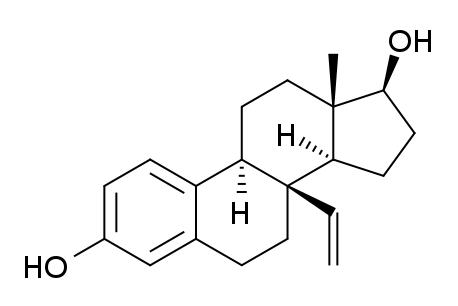

Clinical data
- Other names: 8β-Vinylestradiol; 8β-Vinylestra-1,3,5(10)-triene-3β,17β-diol

Identifiers
- IUPAC name: 8β-Vinylestra-1,3,5(10)-triene-3,17β-diol
- CAS Number: 367929-02-0
- ChemSpider: 8007830
- UNII: D5KU4JGS7Y

Chemical and physical data
- Formula: C_{20}H_{26}O_{2}
- Molar mass: 298.426 g·mol^{−1}
- 3D model (JSmol): Interactive image
- SMILES: C=C[C@@]12CCC3=CC(O)=CC=C3[C@@]1([H])CC[C@]4([C@@]2([H])CC[C@]4([H])O)C
- InChI: InChI=1S/C20H26O2/c1-3-20-11-8-13-12-14(21)4-5-15(13)16(20)9-10-19(2)17(20)6-7-18(19)22/h3-5,12,16-18,21-22H,1,6-11H2,2H3/t16-,17-,18+,19+,20-/m1/s1; Key:NMCRWZRLOOYKTG-SWBPCFCJSA-N

8β-VE2, or 8β-vinylestradiol, also known as 8β-vinylestra-1,3,5(10)-triene-3β,17β-diol, is a synthetic estrogen featuring an estradiol core. It is a highly potent and selective agonist of the ERβ that is used in scientific research to study the function of the ERβ. It has 190-fold higher potency in transactivation assays of the ERβ relative to the ERα and 93- (rat) and 180-fold (human) preference in binding affinity for the ERβ over the ERα.

In rodents, 8β-VE2 stimulates follicular growth and to a comparable extent as estradiol, whereas the highly ERα-selective agonist 16α-LE2 has no effect on ovarian follicle development, indicating that the ERβ and not the ERα is involved in the effects of estrogen on ovarian follicles. In contrast, 16α-LE2 stimulates uterine weight, whereas 8β-VE2 has no effect, indicating that the ERα and not the ERβ is involved in the effects of estrogen on the uterus.

Research has determined through experimental rodent studies with estradiol, 16α-LE2, and 8β-VE2 that the positive, protective effects of estrogens on bone formation resorption and bone mineral density are mediated via the ERα, whereas the ERβ does not appear to be involved. On the other hand, while both ERα and ERβ are expressed in skeletal muscle, it was found that ERβ is the predominant ER subtype that is responsible for estrogen stimulation of skeletal muscle growth and regeneration. Moreover, similarly to testosterone, 8β-VE2 has anabolic effects in skeletal muscle and significantly increases muscle mass as well as produces muscle hypertrophy in rats. In contrast to testosterone however, 8β-VE2 shows no androgenic effects. The effects of 8β-VE2 and ERβ may be mediated, in part, by local stimulation of insulin-like growth factor 1 (IGF-1)-induced myogenic protein synthesis, as 8β-VE2 has been found to strongly induce expression of IGF-1 in the rat levator ani muscle.

== See also ==
- Diarylpropionitrile
- ERB-196
- Erteberel
- FERb 033
- Prinaberel
- WAY-166818
- WAY-200070
- WAY-214156
