= OSU-ERβ-12 =

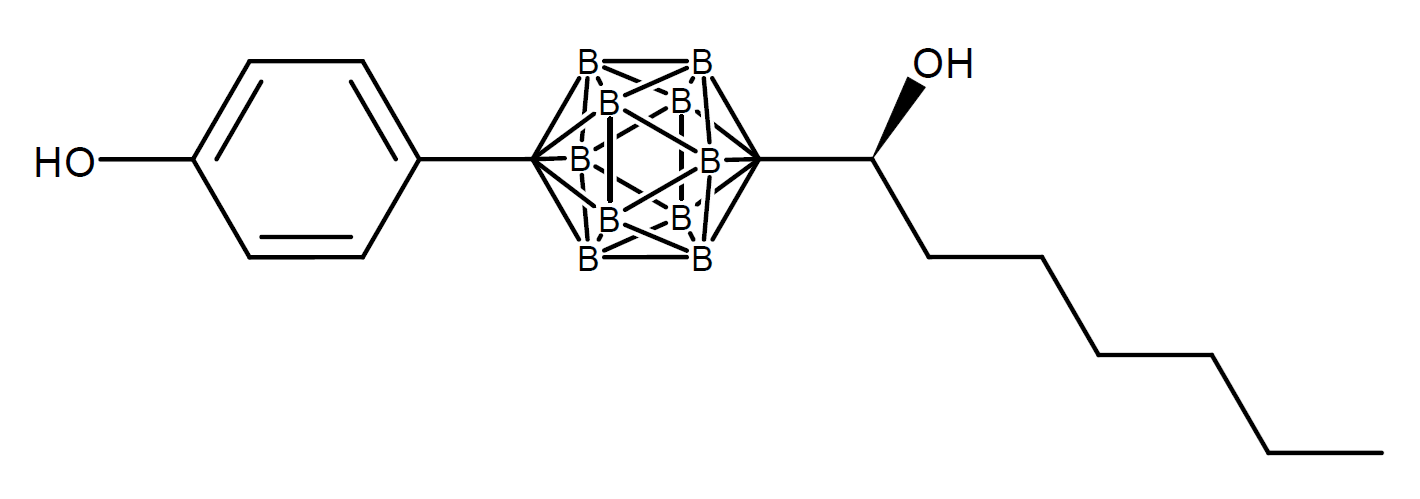
- Hydrogen atoms bonded to boron are omitted for clarity.

Clinical data
- Other names: OSU-ERb-12; WT-IV-12
- Drug class: Selective ERβ agonist

Identifiers
- IUPAC name: (R)-1-[1-(4-hydroxyphenyl)-1,12-dicarba-closo-dodecaborane-12-yl]heptan-1-ol (R)-1-(4-hydroxyphenyl)-12-(1-hydroxyheptyl)-1,12-dicarba-closo-dodecaborane
- CAS Number: 2088837-20-9

Chemical and physical data
- Formula: C_{15}H_{30}B_{10}O_{2}
- Molar mass: 350.50 g·mol^{−1}
- 3D model (JSmol): Interactive image
- SMILES: [C@@H](CCCCCC)(O)C1234[BH]567[BH]89%10C%11%12%13([BH]%14%15%16[BH]%11%17%18[BH]%128%19[BH]954[BH]%17%193[BH]%14%182[BH]%1571[BH]%13%10%166)C%20=CC=C(O)C=C%20
- InChI: InChI=InChI=1S/C15H30B10O2/c1-2-3-4-5-6-13(27)15-21-16-14(11-7-9-12(26)10-8-11)17(16,21)19(14)20(14)18(14,16)22(15,16,21)24(15,18,20)25(15,19,20)23(15,17,19)21/h7-10,13,16-27H,2-6H2,1H3/t13-/m0/s1; Key:OCVDPWVFGOXEMH-ZDUSSCGKSA-N

OSU-ERβ-12 is a highly selective estrogen receptor beta (ERβ) full agonist which is under investigation for potential medical use, such as treatment of fibrosis.

== Pharmacology ==
While OSU-ERβ-12 displays only a 3-fold binding selectivity for ERβ over the estrogen receptor alpha (ERα), it shows more than a 100-fold functional selectivity for ERβ over ERα, with EC_{50} values of 19–78 nM and 3,828–30,000 nM, respectively. The drug shows good drug-like properties and had superior pharmacokinetic properties to those of the earlier ERβ agonist erteberel (LY-500307) in preclinical research. It produces anti-fibrotic effects in rodents.

== Chemistry ==
The chemical synthesis of OSU-ERβ-12 has been described. Various analogues of OSU-ERβ-12 have been described. OSU-ERβ-12 has an unusual para-carborane chemical structure.

== History ==
It was first described in the scientific literature by 2020. The drug was developed by W. Tjarks and colleagues at Ohio State University.

== See also ==
- List of investigational sex-hormonal agents § Estrogenics
- Estrogen receptor beta § Agonists
