= ZK-283197 =

Chemical compound

Clinical data
- Other names: BAY 86-5310; SH-T04211C; ZK283197
- Routes of administration: By mouth
- Drug class: Estrogen; Selective ERβ agonist

Legal status
- Legal status: Investigational

Identifiers
- CAS Number: 634910-57-9 1644565-93-4
- PubChem CID: 9839931
- PubChem SID: 381127857
- UNII: G4AK6B5BV6

Chemical and physical data
- Formula: C_{20}H_{25}FO_{2}
- Molar mass: 316.416 g·mol^{−1}
- 3D model (JSmol): Interactive image
- SMILES: C[C@]12CC[C@]3([C@H]([C@@H]1C[C@H]([C@@H]2F)O)CCC4=C3C=CC(=C4)O)C=C
- InChI: InChI=1S/C20H25FO2/c1-3-20-9-8-19(2)16(11-17(23)18(19)21)15(20)6-4-12-10-13(22)5-7-14(12)20/h3,5,7,10,15-18,22-23H,1,4,6,8-9,11H2,2H3/t15-,16-,17+,18-,19-,20+/m0/s1; Key:LXLNOGZWGYFWQV-CFSBILQPSA-N

ZK-283197 (also known as BAY 86-5310 or SH-T04211C) is a selective and orally active ERβ agonist which was under development by Bayer Healthcare AG for the treatment of vasomotor symptoms. It reached phase II clinical trials prior to the discontinuation of its development. Its development was terminated in 2014.
