= 1-hydroxy-2-naphthoate hydroxylase =

Class of enzymes

Identifiers
- EC no.: 1.14.13.135

Databases
- IntEnz: IntEnz view
- BRENDA: BRENDA entry
- ExPASy: NiceZyme view
- KEGG: KEGG entry
- MetaCyc: metabolic pathway
- PRIAM: profile
- PDB structures: RCSB PDB PDBe PDBsum
Search
- PMC: articles
- PubMed: articles
- NCBI: proteins

1-hydroxy-2-naphthoate hydroxylase (EC 1.14.13.135, 1-hydroxy-2-naphthoic acid hydroxylase) is an enzyme with systematic name 1-hydroxy-2-naphthoate,NAD(P)H:oxygen oxidoreductase (2-hydroxylating, decarboxylating). This enzyme catalyses the following chemical reaction

1-hydroxy-2-naphthoic acid
+ NADH
O_{2} + H^{+}
H_{2}O
1,2-naphthalenediol
+ NAD^{+} + CO_{2}

The four substrates of this enzyme are 1-hydroxy-2-naphthoic acid, reduced nicotinamide adenine dinucleotide (NADH), oxygen, and a proton. Its products are 1,2-naphthalenediol, oxidised NAD^{+}, water, and carbon dioxide. It is involved in chrysene degradation in some bacteria.
