= Tetrahydrochrysene =

Tetrahydrochrysene (THC) may refer to:

- (R,R)-Tetrahydrochrysene ((R,R)-THC)
- (S,S)-Tetrahydrochrysene ((S,S)-THC)
