= Nyasol =

Names
- IUPAC name 4,4'-[(1Z,3R)-3-Ethenyl-1-propene-1,3-diyl]bis[phenol]
- Other names cis-Hinokiresinol; (Z)-Hinokiresinol

Identifiers
CAS Number	96895-25-9
3D model (JSmol)	Interactive image
ChEBI	CHEBI:67889
ChEMBL	ChEMBL451713
ChemSpider	5291646
PubChem CID	6915833
UNII	LK6CH9D7UR
CompTox Dashboard (EPA)	DTXSID501337053
- InChI: InChI=1S/C17H16O2/c1-2-14(15-7-11-17(19)12-8-15)6-3-13-4-9-16(18)10-5-13/h2-12,14,18-19H,1H2/b6-3-/t14-/m1/s1 Key: VEAUNWQYYMXIRB-JHAQOBCDSA-N
- SMILES: C=C[C@H](/C=C\C1=CC=C(C=C1)O)C2=CC=C(C=C2)O

Properties
Chemical formula	C_{17}H_{16}O_{2}
Molar mass	252.313 g·mol^{−1}
- Except where otherwise noted, data are given for materials in their standard state (at 25 °C [77 °F], 100 kPa). Infobox references

Nyasol, also known as cis-hinokiresinol or as (Z)-hinokiresinol, is a lignan that is found in Anemarrhena asphodeloides. It has estrogenic activity, acting as a selective agonist of the ERβ, and hence is a phytoestrogen. In addition, (-)-nyasol has been found to inhibit the production of eicosanoids and nitric oxide in vitro and shows anti-inflammatory effects.
