= WAY-166818 =

Chemical compound

Identifiers
- IUPAC name: 2-(4-Hydroxyphenyl)-1,3-benzoxazol-5-ol
- CAS Number: 142629-43-4
- PubChem CID: 135405741
- ChemSpider: 11193037
- UNII: 9R07VD5I9B
- ChEMBL: ChEMBL187392
- CompTox Dashboard (EPA): DTXSID00465458

Chemical and physical data
- Formula: C_{13}H_{9}NO_{3}
- Molar mass: 227.219 g·mol^{−1}
- 3D model (JSmol): Interactive image
- SMILES: OC1=CC=C(C=C1)C1=NC2=CC(O)=CC=C2O1
- InChI: InChI=1S/C13H9NO3/c15-9-3-1-8(2-4-9)13-14-11-7-10(16)5-6-12(11)17-13/h1-7,15-16H; Key:DPAMLAKLEWYMGF-UHFFFAOYSA-N

WAY-166818 is a synthetic, nonsteroidal estrogen related to WAY-200070 which is used in scientific research. It acts as a highly selective full agonist of the ERβ, with 57- and 164-fold selectivity for the ERβ over the ERα in the rat and mouse, respectively. At the human ERβ and ERα, WAY-166818 has IC_{50} values of 29 nM and 1227 nM (25-fold difference), respectively. The compound has been verified to cross the blood-brain-barrier in rodents.

== See also ==
- 8β-VE2
- Diarylpropionitrile
- ERB-196
- FERb 033
- Menerba
- Prinaberel
- WAY-214156
