= DCW234 =

Chemical compound

Clinical data
- Other names: Butyl 4-(butyryloxy)benzoate

Identifiers
- IUPAC name: butyl 4-butanoyloxybenzoate
- CAS Number: 723759-26-0
- PubChem CID: 1729084
- ChemSpider: 1371590
- UNII: UEQ2HTT5HP
- CompTox Dashboard (EPA): DTXSID901337100

Chemical and physical data
- Formula: C_{15}H_{20}O_{4}
- Molar mass: 264.321 g·mol^{−1}
- 3D model (JSmol): Interactive image
- SMILES: CCCCOC(=O)C1=CC=C(C=C1)OC(=O)CCC
- InChI: InChI=1S/C15H20O4/c1-3-5-11-18-15(17)12-7-9-13(10-8-12)19-14(16)6-4-2/h7-10H,3-6,11H2,1-2H3; Key:LMJDPYAJKHNPHR-UHFFFAOYSA-N

DCW234, also known as butyl 4-(butyryloxy)benzoate, is a synthetic nonsteroidal estrogen and a selective agonist of the ERβ. It shows modest selectivity in terms of affinity and transactivation for the ERβ over the ERα. Its affinity for the ERβ was 3.43 μM and for the ERα was 22.5 μM, while it activated the ERβ and ERα with EC_{50} values of 1.71–2.5 μM and 19.8–22.5 μM, respectively. As such, its binding selectivity for the ERβ over the ERα was 7-fold and its functional selectivity for the ERβ over the ERα was between 10- and 13-fold.

== See also ==
- Diarylpropionitrile
