= 2,8-Dihydroxyhexahydrochrysene =

Chemical compound

Clinical data
- ATC code: None

Identifiers
- CAS Number: 71563-78-5
- PubChem CID: 12519776
- ChemSpider: 23351465

Chemical and physical data
- Formula: C_{18}H_{18}O_{2}
- Molar mass: 266.340 g·mol^{−1}
- 3D model (JSmol): Interactive image
- SMILES: OC1C=CC2=C(C=1)CCC3C2CCC4C3=CC=C(O)C=4
- InChI: InChI=1S/C18H18O2/c19-13-3-7-15-11(9-13)1-5-17-16-8-4-14(20)10-12(16)2-6-18(15)17/h3-4,7-10,17-20H,1-2,5-6H2; Key:WKSBLYZBEPGLTB-UHFFFAOYSA-N

2,8-Dihydroxyhexahydrochrysene (2,8-DHHHC) is a synthetic, nonsteroidal weak estrogen with approximately 1/2,000th the estrogenic potency of the structurally-related estrogen diethylstilbestrol. It is said to be intermediate in structure between estradiol and hexestrol, but conversely to both of them, it is drastically less potent in comparison.

== See also ==
- Tetrahydrochrysene
- Chrysene
- Triphenylethylene
- Estrobin
- Stilbestrol
- Methallenestril
- Ethamoxytriphetol
