= WAY-214156 =

Chemical compound

Identifiers
- IUPAC name: 2,8-Dihydroxy-6H-dibenzo[c,h]chromene-4,12-dicarbonitrile
- CAS Number: 1007853-40-8
- PubChem CID: 11358924
- ChemSpider: 9533851
- UNII: EDB7R887G3

Chemical and physical data
- Formula: C_{19}H_{10}N_{2}O_{3}
- Molar mass: 314.300 g·mol^{−1}
- 3D model (JSmol): Interactive image
- SMILES: C1C2=C(C=CC(=C2)O)C3=C(O1)C4=C(C=C(C=C4C#N)O)C(=C3)C#N
- InChI: InChI=1S/C19H10N2O3/c20-7-10-5-17-15-2-1-13(22)4-12(15)9-24-19(17)18-11(8-21)3-14(23)6-16(10)18/h1-6,22-23H,9H2; Key:UGZYFAJTTRGNOX-UHFFFAOYSA-N

WAY-214156 is a synthetic nonsteroidal estrogen that acts as a highly selective agonist of the ERβ. It is 100-fold selective for the ERβ over the ERα with an IC_{50} of 4.2 nM (compare to estradiol with IC_{50} values of ~3–4 nM for both the ERα and ERβ). The drug is less selective for the ERβ than is prinaberel (ERB-041, WAY-202041), another selective ERβ agonist, but is more potent in comparison. WAY-214156 may produce anti-inflammatory effects via the ERβ and has been proposed as a potential treatment for inflammatory conditions such as rheumatoid arthritis.

== See also ==
- 8β-VE2
- Diarylpropionitrile
- ERB-196
- FERb 033
- WAY-166818
- WAY-200070
