= Terminal end bud =

Details
- System: Endocrine

Terminal end buds (TEBs) are highly proliferative structures at the ends of elongating lactiferous ducts which are involved in development of the mammary glands. TEBs are responsible for the formation of the mammary ductal tree during female puberty.

== See also ==
- Breast development
