= Femarelle =

Dietary supplement range for menopause support

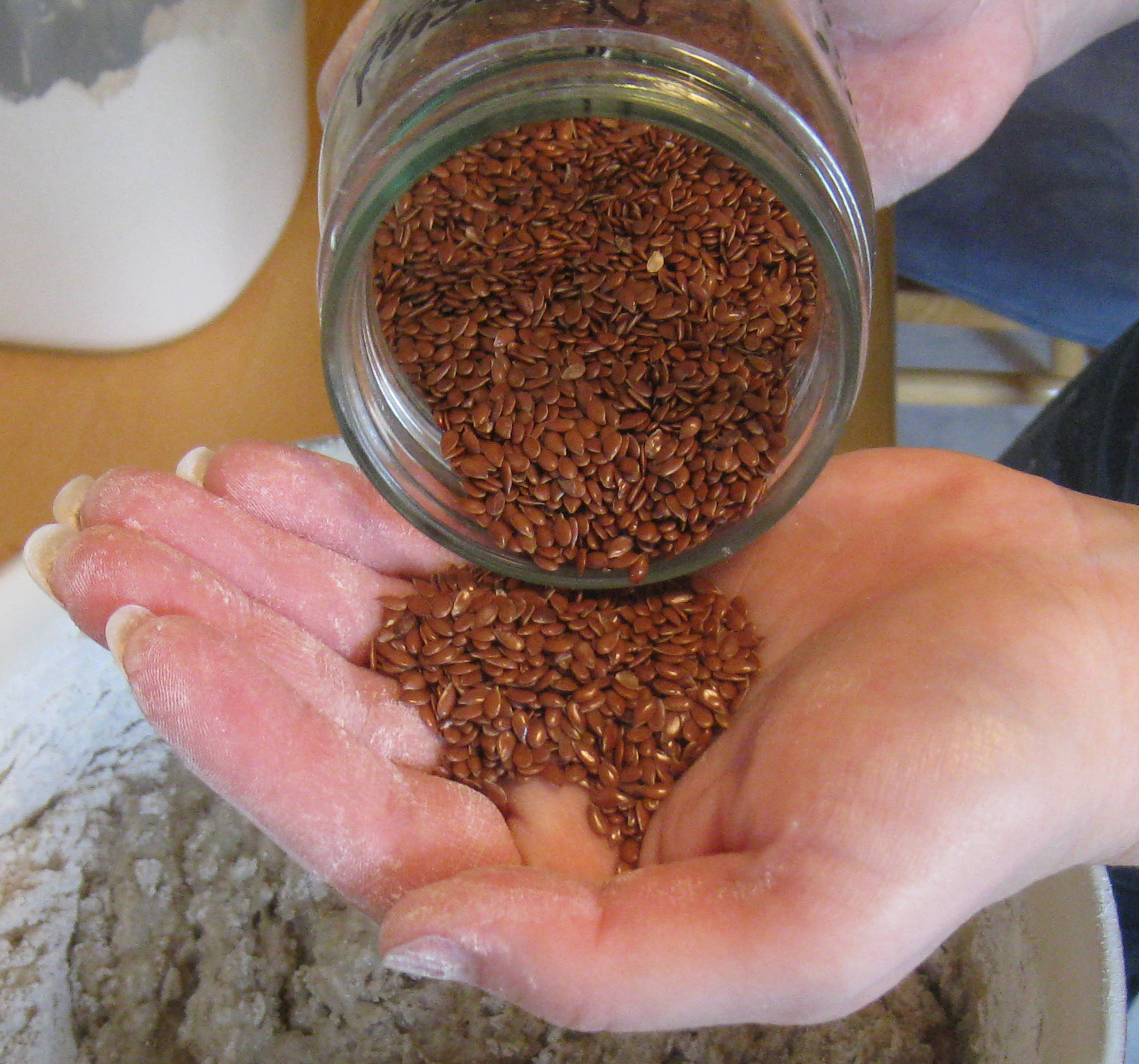
Flaxseed is one of the ingredients used in certain Femarelle formulations.

Femarelle is a dietary supplement range containing DT56a, a tofu-derived soy extract, together with additional ingredients including flaxseed powder, vitamins, and minerals. DT56a has been studied for its potential activity as a selective estrogen receptor modulator (SERM), meaning that it may interact selectively with estrogen receptors in different tissues.

Femarelle has been evaluated in several clinical studies investigating its possible role in supporting women during menopause, including studies on menopausal symptoms, vaginal health, bone health, and safety profile. Some studies reported encouraging findings, including improvements in menopausal symptoms and a favorable safety profile compared with traditional hormone replacement therapy, although the published trials were generally limited by relatively small sample sizes and short study durations.

In 2008, an application was submitted to the European Food Safety Authority (EFSA) regarding a health claim related to bone mineral density and osteoporosis risk. EFSA concluded that the available evidence at that time was insufficient to establish a cause-and-effect relationship between Femarelle consumption and improvements in bone mineral density or reduction of osteoporosis risk in postmenopausal women.

== Product range ==
The Femarelle product range was developed to address the changing needs of women throughout different stages of menopause. Each formulation combines DT56a with selected vitamins, minerals, or botanical ingredients tailored to specific menopausal concerns.

=== Femarelle Recharge ===
Femarelle Recharge is intended for women experiencing common menopausal symptoms such as hot flashes, night sweats, sleep disturbances, and reduced quality of life during menopause. The formulation contains DT56a, flaxseed powder, and vitamin B6.

=== Femarelle Rejuvenate ===
Femarelle Rejuvenate is intended for women in the perimenopausal stage and focuses on symptoms associated with hormonal fluctuations, including mood changes, tiredness, and changes affecting skin and hair. The formulation contains DT56a together with biotin and riboflavin (vitamin B2).

=== Femarelle Unstoppable ===
Femarelle Unstoppable is designed for postmenopausal women, with a focus on bone health, muscle function, and overall wellbeing during later stages of menopause. The formulation contains DT56a, calcium, vitamin D3, biotin, and riboflavin (vitamin B2).

== Mechanism of action ==
DT56a has been described in scientific literature as a selective estrogen receptor modulator (SERM)-like compound. Experimental studies have suggested that DT56a may exert agonistic effects on estrogen receptors in bone and brain tissues, while demonstrating limited activity in uterine and breast tissues.

Several studies have investigated DT56a in relation to menopausal symptoms and bone health. In vitro studies have also reported stimulation of osteoblast activity in cultured human bone cells.

Published studies have additionally suggested that DT56a does not significantly affect circulating hormone levels or blood coagulation parameters.

== See also ==
- Selective estrogen receptor modulator
