= Chrysene =

Chemical compound

- Skeletal structure

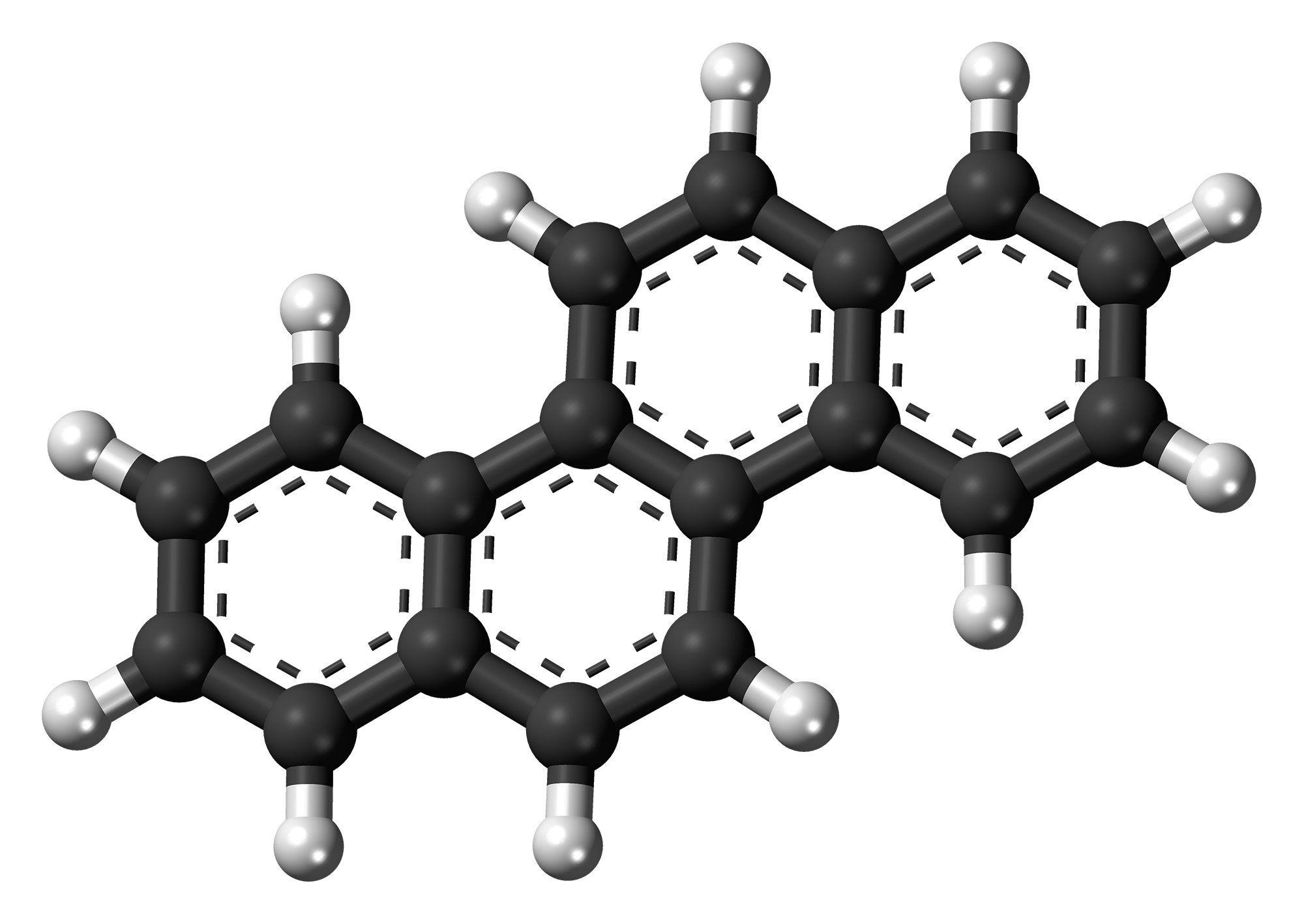

Names
- Preferred IUPAC name Chrysene
- Other names 1,2-Benzophenanthrene; 1,2-Benzphenanthrene; Benzo[a]phenanthrene; NSC 6175; [4]Phenacene

Identifiers
CAS Number	218-01-9
3D model (JSmol)	Interactive image
Beilstein Reference	1909297
ChEBI	CHEBI:51687
ChEMBL	ChEMBL85685
ChemSpider	8817
ECHA InfoCard	100.005.386
EC Number	205-923-4
Gmelin Reference	262600
KEGG	C14222
PubChem CID	9171
RTECS number	GC0700000
UNII	084HCM49PT
CompTox Dashboard (EPA)	DTXSID0022432
- InChI: InChI=1S/C18H12/c1-3-7-15-13(5-1)9-11-18-16-8-4-2-6-14(16)10-12-17(15)18/h1-12H Key: WDECIBYCCFPHNR-UHFFFAOYSA-N; InChI=1/C18H12/c1-3-7-15-13(5-1)9-11-18-16-8-4-2-6-14(16)10-12-17(15)18/h1-12H Key: WDECIBYCCFPHNR-UHFFFAOYAK
- SMILES: c1ccc2c(c1)ccc3c2ccc4c3cccc4

Properties
Chemical formula	C_{18}H_{12}
Molar mass	228.294 g·mol^{−1}
Appearance	white solid
Density	1.274 g/cm^{3}
Melting point	254 °C (489 °F; 527 K)
Boiling point	448 °C (838 °F; 721 K)
Solubility in water	Insoluble
Solubility in ethanol	1 g/1300 mL
Magnetic susceptibility (χ)	−166.67·10^{−6} cm^{3}/mol

Related compounds
Related PAHs	Pyrene, Tetracene, Triphenylene
- Except where otherwise noted, data are given for materials in their standard state (at 25 °C [77 °F], 100 kPa). verify (what is ?) Infobox references

Chrysene is a polycyclic aromatic hydrocarbon (PAH) with the molecular formula C_{18}H_{12} that consists of four fused benzene rings. It is a natural constituent of coal tar, from which it was first isolated and characterized. It is also found in creosote at levels of 0.5–6 mg/kg.

The name "chrysene" originates from Greek Χρύσoς (chrysos), meaning "gold", and is due to the golden-yellow color of the crystals of the hydrocarbon, thought to be the proper color of the compound at the time of its isolation and characterization. However, high purity chrysene is colorless, the yellow hue being due to the traces of its yellow-orange isomer tetracene, which cannot be separated easily.

== Occurrence ==
Chrysene is a constituent of tobacco smoke.

== Safety ==
As with other PAHs, chrysene is suspected to be a human carcinogen. Some evidence suggests that it causes cancer in laboratory animals, but chrysene is often contaminated with more strongly carcinogenic compounds. Chrysene is estimated to have about 1% of the toxicity of benzo(a)pyrene.

== Derivatives ==
Derivatives of chrysene include tetrahydrochrysene and 2,8-dihydroxyhexahydrochrysene, which are estrogenic compounds. The experimental cancer drug crisnatol is a derivative of chrysene.

== See also ==
- Phenanthrene
