= Estrogen receptor beta =

Protein-coding gene in the species Homo sapiens

ESR2
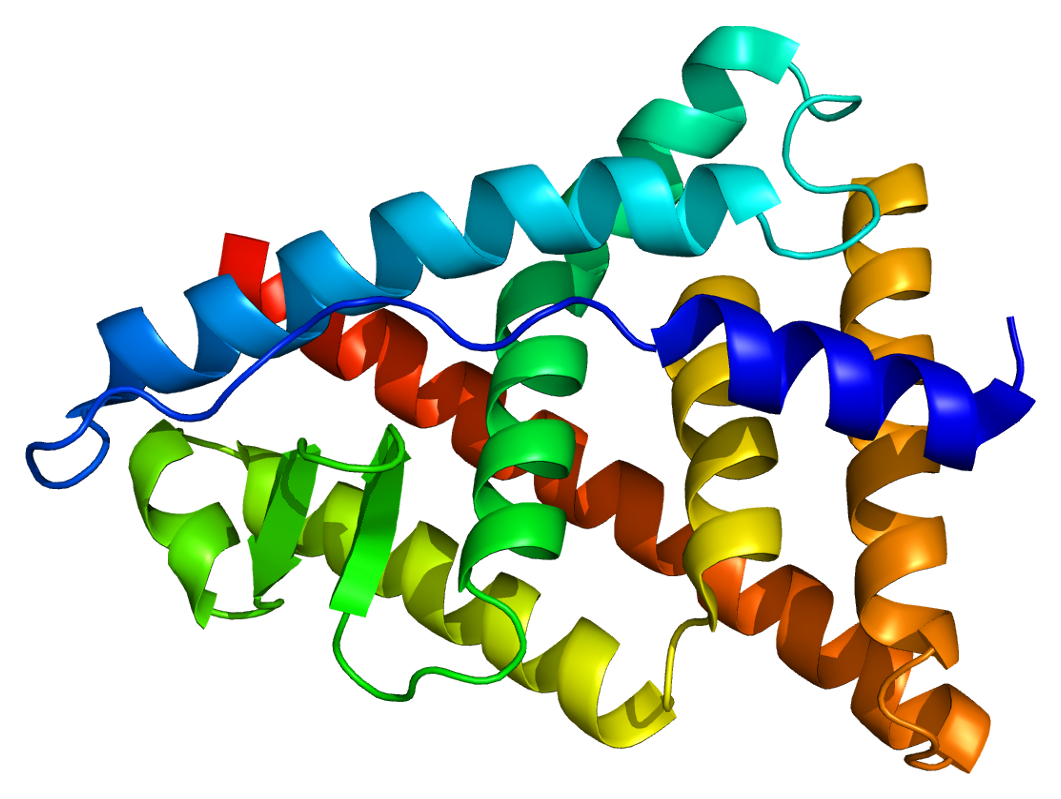

Identifiers
- Aliases: ESR2, ER-BETA, ESR-BETA, ESRB, ESTRB, Erb, NR3A2, estrogen receptor 2, ODG8
- External IDs: OMIM: 601663; MGI: 109392; GeneCards: ESR2
Available structures
PDB	Ortholog search: PDBe RCSB
PDB	List of PDB id codes 4J26, 1L2J, 1NDE, 1QKM, 1U3Q, 1U3R, 1U3S, 1U9E, 1X76, 1X78, 1X7B, 1X7J, 1YY4, 1YYE, 1ZAF, 2FSZ, 2GIU, 2I0G, 2JJ3, 2NV7, 2QTU, 2YJD, 2YLY, 2Z4B, 3OLL, 3OLS, 3OMO, 3OMP, 3OMQ, 4J24, 4ZI1

Gene location (Human)
Chr.	Chromosome 14 (human)
Band	14q23.2-q23.3	Start	64,084,232 bp
Band	14q23.2-q23.3	End	64,338,112 bp

Gene location (Mouse)
Chr.	Chromosome 12 (mouse)
Band	12 C3|12 33.52 cM	Start	76,167,193 bp
Band	12 C3|12 33.52 cM	End	76,224,033 bp
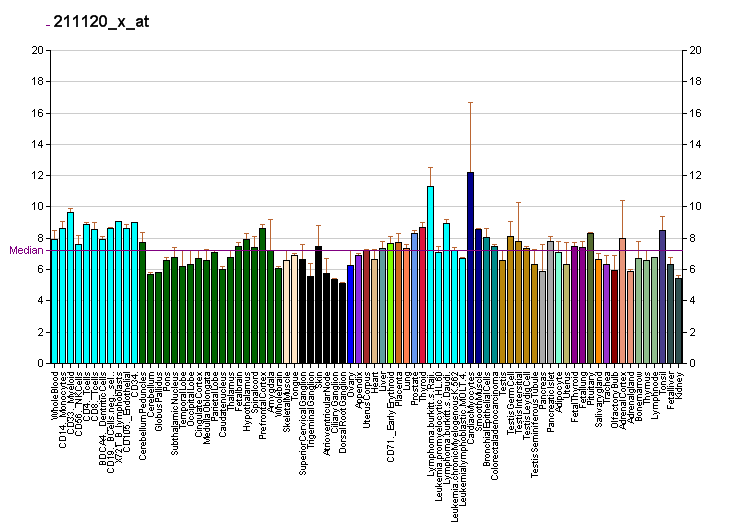

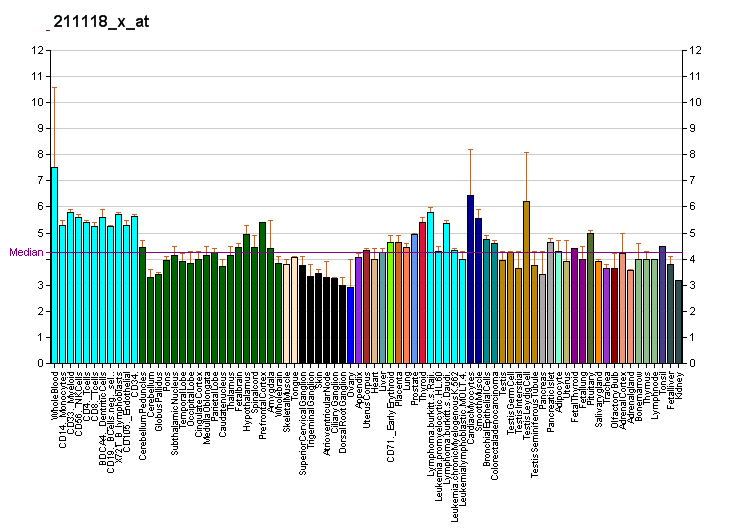

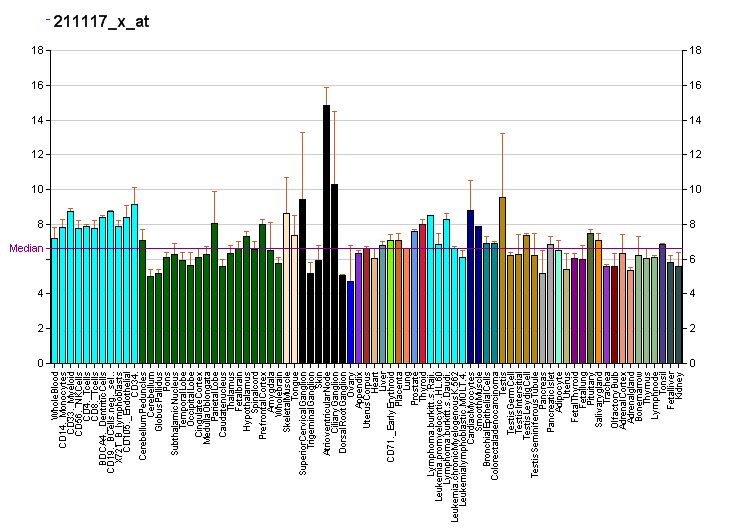
RNA expression pattern
Bgee	Human / Mouse (ortholog); Top expressed in: right adrenal gland; right adrenal cortex; left adrenal gland; left adrenal cortex; secondary oocyte; left ovary; right ovary; granulocyte; epithelium of colon; left testis / Top expressed in: zygote; secondary oocyte; primary oocyte; urethra; female urethra; male urethra; cumulus cell; lumbar subsegment of spinal cord; embryo; ovary; More reference expression data
BioGPS	More reference expression data
Gene ontology
Molecular function	DNA-binding transcription factor activity; nuclear receptor activity; metal ion binding; steroid hormone receptor activity; steroid binding; zinc ion binding; protein binding; DNA binding; sequence-specific DNA binding; transcription coactivator activity; receptor antagonist activity; lipid binding; enzyme binding; estrogen response element binding; core promoter sequence-specific DNA binding; estrogen receptor activity; identical protein binding; DNA-binding transcription factor activity, RNA polymerase II-specific; RNA polymerase II cis-regulatory region sequence-specific DNA binding
Cellular component	mitochondrion; nucleus; nucleoplasm; extracellular region
Biological process	regulation of transcription, DNA-templated; transcription, DNA-templated; negative regulation of cell growth; transcription initiation from RNA polymerase II promoter; positive regulation of DNA-binding transcription factor activity; cell-cell signaling; signal transduction; extracellular negative regulation of signal transduction; positive regulation of transcription, DNA-templated; negative regulation of transcription by RNA polymerase II; intracellular estrogen receptor signaling pathway; positive regulation of transcription by RNA polymerase II; cellular response to estradiol stimulus; negative regulation of signaling receptor activity
Sources:Amigo / QuickGO
Orthologs
Databases	NCBI: entry; OMA: entry
Species	Human	Mouse
Entrez	2100	13983
Ensembl	ENSG00000140009	ENSMUSG00000021055
UniProt	Q92731	O08537
RefSeq (mRNA)	NM_001040275; NM_001040276; NM_001214902; NM_001214903; NM_001271876 NM_001271877; NM_001291712; NM_001291723; NM_001437	NM_010157; NM_207707
RefSeq (protein)	NP_001035365; NP_001201831; NP_001258805; NP_001258806; NP_001278641 NP_001278652; NP_001428	NP_034287; NP_997590
Location (UCSC)	Chr 14: 64.08 – 64.34 Mb	Chr 12: 76.17 – 76.22 Mb
PubMed search
- Wikidata
View/Edit Human	View/Edit Mouse

Estrogen receptor beta (ERβ) also known as NR3A2 (nuclear receptor subfamily 3, group A, member 2) is one of two main types of estrogen receptor—a nuclear receptor which is activated by the sex hormone estrogen. In humans ERβ is encoded by the ESR2 gene.

== Function ==
ERβ is a member of the family of estrogen receptors and the superfamily of nuclear receptor transcription factors. The gene product contains an N-terminal DNA binding domain and C-terminal ligand binding domain and is localized to the nucleus, cytoplasm, and mitochondria. Upon binding to 17-β-estradiol, estriol or related ligands, the encoded protein forms homo-dimers or hetero-dimers with estrogen receptor α that interact with specific DNA sequences to activate transcription. Some isoforms dominantly inhibit the activity of other estrogen receptor family members. Several alternatively spliced transcript variants of this gene have been described, but the full-length nature of some of these variants has not been fully characterized.

ERβ may inhibit cell proliferation and opposes the actions of ERα in reproductive tissue. ERβ may also have an important role in adaptive function of the lung during pregnancy.

ERβ is a potent tumor suppressor and plays a crucial role in many cancer types such as prostate cancer and ovarian cancer.

=== Mammary gland ===
ERβ knockout mice show normal mammary gland development at puberty and are able to lactate normally. The mammary glands of adult virgin female mice are indistinguishable from those of age-matched wild-type virgin female mice. This is in contrast to ERα knockout mice, in which a complete absence of mammary gland development at puberty and thereafter is observed. Administration of the selective ERβ agonist ERB-041 to immature ovariectomized female rats produced no observable effects in the mammary glands, further indicating that the ERβ is non-mammotrophic.

Although ERβ is not required for pubertal development of the mammary glands, it may be involved in terminal differentiation in pregnancy, and may also be necessary to maintain the organization and differentiation of mammary epithelium in adulthood. In old female ERβ knockout mice, severe cystic mammary disease that is similar in appearance to postmenopausal mastopathy develops, whereas this does not occur in aged wild-type female mice. However, ERβ knockout mice are not only deficient in ERβ signaling in the mammary glands, but also have deficient progesterone exposure due to impairment of corpora lutea formation. This complicates attribution of the preceding findings to mammary ERβ signaling.

Selective ERβ agonism with diarylpropionitrile (DPN) has been found to counteract the proliferative effects in the mammary glands of selective ERα agonism with propylpyrazoletriol (PPT) in ovariectomized postmenopausal female rats. Similarly, overexpression of ERβ via lentiviral infection in mature virgin female rats decreases mammary proliferation. ERα signaling has proliferative effects in both normal breast and breast cancer cell lines, whereas ERβ has generally antiproliferative effects in such cell lines. However, ERβ has been found to have proliferative effects in some breast cell lines.

Expression of ERα and ERβ in the mammary gland have been found to vary throughout the menstrual cycle and in an ovariectomized state in female rats. Whereas mammary ERα in rhesus macaques is downregulated in response to increased estradiol levels, expression of ERβ in the mammary glands is not. Expression of ERα and ERβ in the mammary glands also differs throughout life in female mice. Mammary ERα expression is higher and mammary ERβ expression lower in younger female mice, while mammary ERα expression is lower and mammary ERβ expression higher in older female mice as well as in parous female mice. Mammary proliferation and estrogen sensitivity is higher in young female mice than in old or parous female mice, particularly during pubertal mammary gland development.

== Tissue distribution ==
ERβ is expressed by many tissues including the uterus, blood monocytes and tissue macrophages, colonic and pulmonary epithelial cells and in prostatic epithelium and in malignant counterparts of these tissues. Also, ERβ is found throughout the brain at different concentrations in different neuron clusters. ERβ is also highly expressed in normal breast epithelium, although its expression declines with cancer progression. ERβ is expressed in all subtypes of breast cancer. Controversy regarding ERβ protein expression has hindered study of ERβ, but highly sensitive monoclonal antibodies have been produced and well-validated to address these issues.

== ERβ abnormalities ==
ERβ function is related to various cardiovascular targets including ATP-binding cassette transporter A1 (ABCA1) and apolipoprotein A1 (ApoA-1). Polymorphism may affect ERβ function and lead to altered responses in postmenopausal women receiving hormone replacement therapy. Abnormalities in gene expression associated with ERβ have also been linked to autism spectrum disorder.

== Disease ==
=== Cardiovascular disease ===
Mutations in ERβ have been shown to influence cardiomyocytes, the cells that comprise the largest part of the heart, and can lead to an increased risk of cardiovascular disease (CVD). There is a disparity in prevalence of CVD between pre- and post-menopausal women, and the difference can be attributed to estrogen levels. Many types of ERβ receptors exist in order to help regulate gene expression and subsequent health in the body, but binding of 17βE2 (a naturally occurring estrogen) specifically improves cardiac metabolism. The heart utilizes a lot of energy in the form of ATP to properly pump blood and maintain physiological requirements in order to live, and 17βE2 helps by increasing these myocardial ATP levels and respiratory function.

In addition, 17βE2 can alter myocardial signaling pathways and stimulate myocyte regeneration, which can aid in inhibiting myocyte cell death. The ERβ signaling pathway plays a role in both vasodilation and arterial dilation, which contributes to an individual having a healthy heart rate and a decrease in blood pressure. This regulation can increase endothelial function and arterial perfusion, both of which are important to myocyte health. Thus, alterations in this signaling pathways due to ERβ mutation could lead to myocyte cell death from physiological stress. While ERα has a more profound role in regeneration after myocyte cell death, ERβ can still help by increasing endothelial progenitor cell activation and subsequent cardiac function.

=== Alzheimer's disease ===
Genetic variation in ERβ is both sex and age dependent and ERβ polymorphism can lead to accelerated brain aging, cognitive impairment, and development of AD pathology. Similar to CVD, post-menopausal women have an increased risk of developing Alzheimer's disease (AD) due to a loss of estrogen, which affects proper aging of the hippocampus, neural survival and regeneration, and amyloid metabolism. ERβ mRNA is highly expressed in hippocampal formation, an area of the brain that is associated with memory. This expression contributes to increased neuronal survival and helps protect against neurodegenerative diseases such as AD. The pathology of AD is also associated with accumulation of amyloid beta peptide (Aβ). While a proper concentration of Aβ in the brain is important for healthy functioning, too much can lead to cognitive impairment. Thus, ERβ helps control Aβ levels by maintaining the protein it is derived from, β-amyloid precursor protein. ERβ helps by up-regulating insulin-degrading enzyme (IDE), which leads to β-amyloid degradation when accumulation levels begin to rise. However, in AD, lack of ERβ causes a decrease in this degradation and an increase in plaque build-up.

ERβ also plays a role in regulating APOE, a risk factor for AD that redistributes lipids across cells. APOE expression in the hippocampus is specifically regulated by 17βE2, affecting learning and memory in individuals afflicted with AD. Thus, estrogen therapy via an ERβ-targeted approach can be used as a prevention method for AD either before or at the onset of menopause. Interactions between ERα and ERβ can lead to antagonistic actions in the brain, so an ERβ-targeted approach can increase therapeutic neural responses independently of ERα. Therapeutically, ERβ can be used in both men and women in order to regulate plaque formation in the brain.

== Neuroprotective benefits ==
=== Synaptic strength and plasticity ===
ERβ levels can dictate both synaptic strength and neuroplasticity through neural structure modifications. Variations in endogenous estrogen levels cause changes in dendritic architecture in the hippocampus, which affects neural signaling and plasticity. Specifically, lower estrogen levels lead to decreased dendritic spines and improper signaling, inhibiting plasticity of the brain. However, treatment of 17βE2 can reverse this affect, giving it the ability to modify hippocampal structure. As a result of the relationship between dendritic architecture and long-term potentiation (LTP), ERβ can enhance LTP and lead to an increase in synaptic strength. Furthermore, 17βE2 promotes neurogenesis in developing hippocampal neurons and neurons in the subventricular zone and dentate gyrus of the adult human brain. Specifically, ERβ increases the proliferation of progenitor cells to create new neurons and can be increased later in life through 17βE2 treatment.

== Ligands ==
=== Agonists ===
==== Non-selective ====
- Endogenous estrogens (e.g., estradiol, estrone, estriol, estetrol)
- Natural estrogens (e.g., conjugated estrogens)
- Synthetic estrogens (e.g., ethinylestradiol, diethylstilbestrol)

==== Selective ====
Agonists of ERβ selective over ERα include:

- 20-Hydroxyecdysone (ecdysterone, 20-HE, 20-E) — phytoecdysteroid
- 3β-Androstanediol (3β-diol) – endogenous
- 8β-VE_{2}
- AC-186
- Apigenin – phytoestrogen
- Daidzein – phytoestrogen
- DCW234
- Dehydroepiandrosterone (DHEA) – endogenous
- Diarylpropionitrile (DPN)
- ERB-79 and its active enantiomer ERB-26
- ERB-196 (WAY-202196)
- Erteberel (SERBA-1, LY-500307)
- FERb 033 – 62-fold selectivity for ERβ over ERα
- Genistein – phytoestrogen; 16-fold selectivity for ERβ over ERα
- Liquiritigenin (Menerba) – phytoestrogen
- OSU-ERβ-12
- Penduletin – phytoestrogen
- Prinaberel (ERB-041, WAY-202041)
- S-Equol ((S)-4',7-isoflavandiol) – phytoestrogen; 13-fold selectivity for ERβ over ERα
- WAY-166818
- WAY-200070
- WAY-214156

=== Antagonists ===
==== Non-selective ====
- Selective estrogen receptor modulators (e.g., tamoxifen, raloxifene)
- Antiestrogens (e.g., fulvestrant, ICI-164384)

==== Selective ====
Antagonists of ERβ selective over ERα include:

- PHTPP
- (R,R)-Tetrahydrochrysene ((R,R)-THC) – actually not selective over ERα, but rather an agonist instead of antagonist of ERα

=== Affinities ===
Affinities of estrogen receptor ligands for the ERα and ERβ
Ligand	Other names	Relative binding affinities (RBA, %)^{a}		Absolute binding affinities (K_{i}, nM)^{a}		Action
Ligand	Other names	ERα	ERβ	ERα	ERβ	Action
Estradiol	E2; 17β-Estradiol	100	100	0.115 (0.04–0.24)	0.15 (0.10–2.08)	Estrogen
Estrone	E1; 17-Ketoestradiol	16.39 (0.7–60)	6.5 (1.36–52)	0.445 (0.3–1.01)	1.75 (0.35–9.24)	Estrogen
Estriol	E3; 16α-OH-17β-E2	12.65 (4.03–56)	26 (14.0–44.6)	0.45 (0.35–1.4)	0.7 (0.63–0.7)	Estrogen
Estetrol	E4; 15α,16α-Di-OH-17β-E2	4.0	3.0	4.9	19	Estrogen
Alfatradiol	17α-Estradiol	20.5 (7–80.1)	8.195 (2–42)	0.2–0.52	0.43–1.2	Metabolite
16-Epiestriol	16β-Hydroxy-17β-estradiol	7.795 (4.94–63)	50	?	?	Metabolite
17-Epiestriol	16α-Hydroxy-17α-estradiol	55.45 (29–103)	79–80	?	?	Metabolite
16,17-Epiestriol	16β-Hydroxy-17α-estradiol	1.0	13	?	?	Metabolite
2-Hydroxyestradiol	2-OH-E2	22 (7–81)	11–35	2.5	1.3	Metabolite
2-Methoxyestradiol	2-MeO-E2	0.0027–2.0	1.0	?	?	Metabolite
4-Hydroxyestradiol	4-OH-E2	13 (8–70)	7–56	1.0	1.9	Metabolite
4-Methoxyestradiol	4-MeO-E2	2.0	1.0	?	?	Metabolite
2-Hydroxyestrone	2-OH-E1	2.0–4.0	0.2–0.4	?	?	Metabolite
2-Methoxyestrone	2-MeO-E1	<0.001–<1	<1	?	?	Metabolite
4-Hydroxyestrone	4-OH-E1	1.0–2.0	1.0	?	?	Metabolite
4-Methoxyestrone	4-MeO-E1	<1	<1	?	?	Metabolite
16α-Hydroxyestrone	16α-OH-E1; 17-Ketoestriol	2.0–6.5	35	?	?	Metabolite
2-Hydroxyestriol	2-OH-E3	2.0	1.0	?	?	Metabolite
4-Methoxyestriol	4-MeO-E3	1.0	1.0	?	?	Metabolite
Estradiol sulfate	E2S; Estradiol 3-sulfate	<1	<1	?	?	Metabolite
Estradiol disulfate	Estradiol 3,17β-disulfate	0.0004	?	?	?	Metabolite
Estradiol 3-glucuronide	E2-3G	0.0079	?	?	?	Metabolite
Estradiol 17β-glucuronide	E2-17G	0.0015	?	?	?	Metabolite
Estradiol 3-gluc. 17β-sulfate	E2-3G-17S	0.0001	?	?	?	Metabolite
Estrone sulfate	E1S; Estrone 3-sulfate	<1	<1	>10	>10	Metabolite
Estradiol benzoate	EB; Estradiol 3-benzoate	10	?	?	?	Estrogen
Estradiol 17β-benzoate	E2-17B	11.3	32.6	?	?	Estrogen
Estrone methyl ether	Estrone 3-methyl ether	0.145	?	?	?	Estrogen
ent-Estradiol	1-Estradiol	1.31–12.34	9.44–80.07	?	?	Estrogen
Equilin	7-Dehydroestrone	13 (4.0–28.9)	13.0–49	0.79	0.36	Estrogen
Equilenin	6,8-Didehydroestrone	2.0–15	7.0–20	0.64	0.62	Estrogen
17β-Dihydroequilin	7-Dehydro-17β-estradiol	7.9–113	7.9–108	0.09	0.17	Estrogen
17α-Dihydroequilin	7-Dehydro-17α-estradiol	18.6 (18–41)	14–32	0.24	0.57	Estrogen
17β-Dihydroequilenin	6,8-Didehydro-17β-estradiol	35–68	90–100	0.15	0.20	Estrogen
17α-Dihydroequilenin	6,8-Didehydro-17α-estradiol	20	49	0.50	0.37	Estrogen
Δ^{8}-Estradiol	8,9-Dehydro-17β-estradiol	68	72	0.15	0.25	Estrogen
Δ^{8}-Estrone	8,9-Dehydroestrone	19	32	0.52	0.57	Estrogen
Ethinylestradiol	EE; 17α-Ethynyl-17β-E2	120.9 (68.8–480)	44.4 (2.0–144)	0.02–0.05	0.29–0.81	Estrogen
Mestranol	EE 3-methyl ether	?	2.5	?	?	Estrogen
Moxestrol	RU-2858; 11β-Methoxy-EE	35–43	5–20	0.5	2.6	Estrogen
Methylestradiol	17α-Methyl-17β-estradiol	70	44	?	?	Estrogen
Diethylstilbestrol	DES; Stilbestrol	129.5 (89.1–468)	219.63 (61.2–295)	0.04	0.05	Estrogen
Hexestrol	Dihydrodiethylstilbestrol	153.6 (31–302)	60–234	0.06	0.06	Estrogen
Dienestrol	Dehydrostilbestrol	37 (20.4–223)	56–404	0.05	0.03	Estrogen
Benzestrol (B2)	–	114	?	?	?	Estrogen
Chlorotrianisene	TACE	1.74	?	15.30	?	Estrogen
Triphenylethylene	TPE	0.074	?	?	?	Estrogen
Triphenylbromoethylene	TPBE	2.69	?	?	?	Estrogen
Tamoxifen	ICI-46,474	3 (0.1–47)	3.33 (0.28–6)	3.4–9.69	2.5	SERM
Afimoxifene	4-Hydroxytamoxifen; 4-OHT	100.1 (1.7–257)	10 (0.98–339)	2.3 (0.1–3.61)	0.04–4.8	SERM
Toremifene	4-Chlorotamoxifen; 4-CT	?	?	7.14–20.3	15.4	SERM
Clomifene	MRL-41	25 (19.2–37.2)	12	0.9	1.2	SERM
Cyclofenil	F-6066; Sexovid	151–152	243	?	?	SERM
Nafoxidine	U-11,000A	30.9–44	16	0.3	0.8	SERM
Raloxifene	–	41.2 (7.8–69)	5.34 (0.54–16)	0.188–0.52	20.2	SERM
Arzoxifene	LY-353,381	?	?	0.179	?	SERM
Lasofoxifene	CP-336,156	10.2–166	19.0	0.229	?	SERM
Ormeloxifene	Centchroman	?	?	0.313	?	SERM
Levormeloxifene	6720-CDRI; NNC-460,020	1.55	1.88	?	?	SERM
Ospemifene	Deaminohydroxytoremifene	0.82–2.63	0.59–1.22	?	?	SERM
Bazedoxifene	–	?	?	0.053	?	SERM
Etacstil	GW-5638	4.30	11.5	?	?	SERM
ICI-164,384	–	63.5 (3.70–97.7)	166	0.2	0.08	Antiestrogen
Fulvestrant	ICI-182,780	43.5 (9.4–325)	21.65 (2.05–40.5)	0.42	1.3	Antiestrogen
Propylpyrazoletriol	PPT	49 (10.0–89.1)	0.12	0.40	92.8	ERα agonist
16α-LE2	16α-Lactone-17β-estradiol	14.6–57	0.089	0.27	131	ERα agonist
16α-Iodo-E2	16α-Iodo-17β-estradiol	30.2	2.30	?	?	ERα agonist
Methylpiperidinopyrazole	MPP	11	0.05	?	?	ERα antagonist
Diarylpropionitrile	DPN	0.12–0.25	6.6–18	32.4	1.7	ERβ agonist
8β-VE2	8β-Vinyl-17β-estradiol	0.35	22.0–83	12.9	0.50	ERβ agonist
Prinaberel	ERB-041; WAY-202,041	0.27	67–72	?	?	ERβ agonist
ERB-196	WAY-202,196	?	180	?	?	ERβ agonist
Erteberel	SERBA-1; LY-500,307	?	?	2.68	0.19	ERβ agonist
SERBA-2	–	?	?	14.5	1.54	ERβ agonist
Coumestrol	–	9.225 (0.0117–94)	64.125 (0.41–185)	0.14–80.0	0.07–27.0	Xenoestrogen
Genistein	–	0.445 (0.0012–16)	33.42 (0.86–87)	2.6–126	0.3–12.8	Xenoestrogen
Equol	–	0.2–0.287	0.85 (0.10–2.85)	?	?	Xenoestrogen
Daidzein	–	0.07 (0.0018–9.3)	0.7865 (0.04–17.1)	2.0	85.3	Xenoestrogen
Biochanin A	–	0.04 (0.022–0.15)	0.6225 (0.010–1.2)	174	8.9	Xenoestrogen
Kaempferol	–	0.07 (0.029–0.10)	2.2 (0.002–3.00)	?	?	Xenoestrogen
Naringenin	–	0.0054 (<0.001–0.01)	0.15 (0.11–0.33)	?	?	Xenoestrogen
8-Prenylnaringenin	8-PN	4.4	?	?	?	Xenoestrogen
Quercetin	–	<0.001–0.01	0.002–0.040	?	?	Xenoestrogen
Ipriflavone	–	<0.01	<0.01	?	?	Xenoestrogen
Miroestrol	–	0.39	?	?	?	Xenoestrogen
Deoxymiroestrol	–	2.0	?	?	?	Xenoestrogen
β-Sitosterol	–	<0.001–0.0875	<0.001–0.016	?	?	Xenoestrogen
Resveratrol	–	<0.001–0.0032	?	?	?	Xenoestrogen
α-Zearalenol	–	48 (13–52.5)	?	?	?	Xenoestrogen
β-Zearalenol	–	0.6 (0.032–13)	?	?	?	Xenoestrogen
Zeranol	α-Zearalanol	48–111	?	?	?	Xenoestrogen
Taleranol	β-Zearalanol	16 (13–17.8)	14	0.8	0.9	Xenoestrogen
Zearalenone	ZEN	7.68 (2.04–28)	9.45 (2.43–31.5)	?	?	Xenoestrogen
Zearalanone	ZAN	0.51	?	?	?	Xenoestrogen
Bisphenol A	BPA	0.0315 (0.008–1.0)	0.135 (0.002–4.23)	195	35	Xenoestrogen
Endosulfan	EDS	<0.001–<0.01	<0.01	?	?	Xenoestrogen
Kepone	Chlordecone	0.0069–0.2	?	?	?	Xenoestrogen
o,p'-DDT	–	0.0073–0.4	?	?	?	Xenoestrogen
p,p'-DDT	–	0.03	?	?	?	Xenoestrogen
Methoxychlor	p,p'-Dimethoxy-DDT	0.01 (<0.001–0.02)	0.01–0.13	?	?	Xenoestrogen
HPTE	Hydroxychlor; p,p'-OH-DDT	1.2–1.7	?	?	?	Xenoestrogen
Testosterone	T; 4-Androstenolone	<0.0001–<0.01	<0.002–0.040	>5000	>5000	Androgen
Dihydrotestosterone	DHT; 5α-Androstanolone	0.01 (<0.001–0.05)	0.0059–0.17	221–>5000	73–1688	Androgen
Nandrolone	19-Nortestosterone; 19-NT	0.01	0.23	765	53	Androgen
Dehydroepiandrosterone	DHEA; Prasterone	0.038 (<0.001–0.04)	0.019–0.07	245–1053	163–515	Androgen
5-Androstenediol	A5; Androstenediol	6	17	3.6	0.9	Androgen
4-Androstenediol	–	0.5	0.6	23	19	Androgen
4-Androstenedione	A4; Androstenedione	<0.01	<0.01	>10000	>10000	Androgen
3α-Androstanediol	3α-Adiol	0.07	0.3	260	48	Androgen
3β-Androstanediol	3β-Adiol	3	7	6	2	Androgen
Androstanedione	5α-Androstanedione	<0.01	<0.01	>10000	>10000	Androgen
Etiocholanedione	5β-Androstanedione	<0.01	<0.01	>10000	>10000	Androgen
Methyltestosterone	17α-Methyltestosterone	<0.0001	?	?	?	Androgen
Ethinyl-3α-androstanediol	17α-Ethynyl-3α-adiol	4.0	<0.07	?	?	Estrogen
Ethinyl-3β-androstanediol	17α-Ethynyl-3β-adiol	50	5.6	?	?	Estrogen
Progesterone	P4; 4-Pregnenedione	<0.001–0.6	<0.001–0.010	?	?	Progestogen
Norethisterone	NET; 17α-Ethynyl-19-NT	0.085 (0.0015–<0.1)	0.1 (0.01–0.3)	152	1084	Progestogen
Norethynodrel	5(10)-Norethisterone	0.5 (0.3–0.7)	<0.1–0.22	14	53	Progestogen
Tibolone	7α-Methylnorethynodrel	0.5 (0.45–2.0)	0.2–0.076	?	?	Progestogen
Δ^{4}-Tibolone	7α-Methylnorethisterone	0.069–<0.1	0.027–<0.1	?	?	Progestogen
3α-Hydroxytibolone	–	2.5 (1.06–5.0)	0.6–0.8	?	?	Progestogen
3β-Hydroxytibolone	–	1.6 (0.75–1.9)	0.070–0.1	?	?	Progestogen
Footnotes: ^{a} = (1) Binding affinity values are of the format "median (range)" (# (#–#)), "range" (#–#), or "value" (#) depending on the values available. The full sets of values within the ranges can be found in the Wiki code. (2) Binding affinities were determined via displacement studies in a variety of in-vitro systems with labeled estradiol and human ERα and ERβ proteins (except the ERβ values from Kuiper et al. (1997), which are rat ERβ). Sources: See template page.

== Interactions ==
Estrogen receptor beta has been shown to interact with:

- CCND1,
- ESR1
- MAD2L1,
- NCOA3,
- NCOA6,
- RBM39, and
- SRC.
