= Menerba =

Botanical drug candidate

Menerba, also known as Menopause Formula 101 (MF-101), is a botanical drug candidate that acts as a selective estrogen receptor modulator (SERM) which is being studied for its potential to relieve hot flashes associated with menopause. Menerba, an estrogen receptor beta (ERβ) agonist (ERBA), is part of a new class of receptor subtype-selective estrogens, which is selective in transcriptional regulation to one of the two known estrogen receptor (ER) subtypes. Menerba consists of 22 herbs that have been used historically in traditional Chinese medicine.

Menerba binds to both ERα and ERβ and with equal affinity, but does not activate ERα and instead activates only ERβ-mediated gene transcription.

== Mode of action ==
Menerba has been reported to alleviate menopausal symptoms such as hot flashes, while having no stimulative effects on endometrium or breast tissue.

In mouse xenograft models, Menerba produced a different conformation in estrogen receptor alpha (ERα) from ERβ when compared with the conformations produced by estradiol. The specific conformational change induced by Menerba allows ERβ to bind to an estrogen response element and recruit coregulatory proteins that are required for gene activation. It has been shown that the increased risk of breast and uterine cancers is associated with ERα activation and that ERβ blocks the growth promoting effects on breast cancer cells. Menerba does not activate the ERα-regulated proliferative genes, c-myc and cyclin D1, or stimulate MCF-7 breast cancer cell proliferation or tumor formation, demonstrating that it may be a viable alternative for hormone therapy in comparison to estrogens that non-selectively activate both ER subtypes.

In 2007, Menerba completed a multi-center Phase 2, double-blind, placebo-controlled randomized clinical trial evaluating its potential for the treatment of hot flashes in 217 healthy post-menopausal women in the U.S. The principal investigator of the trial was Dr. Deborah Grady from the University of California, San Francisco. Menerba showed a statistically significant reduction in the number of hot flashes after 12 weeks of treatment and had a statistically significant reduction in nighttime awakenings from hot flashes (-67%, p=0.05). There was no difference in uterine bleeding between treatment groups and placebo, and no uterine abnormalities were observed during the study. The only side effect observed was mild loose stools (12% in treatment group vs. 3% in the placebo group).

Further studies have shown that most active estrogenic compound in Menerba is liquiritigenin, derived from the root of Glycyrrhizae uralensis Fisch, one of the 22 botanically derived ingredients found in Menerba. In a mouse xenograft model, liquiritigenin activated multiple ER regulatory elements and native target genes with ERβ but not ERα. The ERβ-selectivity of liquiritigenin was due to the selective recruitment of the coactivator steroid receptor coactivator-2 to target genes. Liquiritigenin did not stimulate uterine size or tumorigenesis of MCF-7 breast cancer cells. The results demonstrate that some plants contain highly selective estrogens for ERβ and are as selective as synthetic compounds, but regulate different genes. (PLOs 1 – July 17) and suggests that plant-derived ERb-selective compounds could lead to safer, more attractive alternative therapies for menopausal symptoms. In a further study, Menerba was shown to regulate calcium influx, which is related to temperature regulation.

Menerba underwent Phase 1 safety trials evaluating its toxicity at 10 g/day and 15 g/day doses. No significant toxicities have been observed in any of the animal studies with doses ranging from 2000 mg/kg/day in dogs to 16,000 mg/kg/day in rodents. Due to acceptable toxicity results on the Phase 1 trial, the FDA approved Menerba to initiate a Phase 3 trial with 1200 women reporting seven or more menopausal hot flashes per day.

== See also ==
- Femarelle
- Rimostil
