= ERB-196 =

Chemical compound

Clinical data
- Other names: WAY-202196

Identifiers
- IUPAC name: 3-(3-Fluoro-4-hydroxyphenyl)-7-hydroxynaphthalene-1-carbonitrile
- CAS Number: 550997-55-2
- PubChem CID: 6102691
- DrugBank: DB06875
- ChemSpider: 4810213
- UNII: 470CL5L4AC
- ChEMBL: ChEMBL192154
- CompTox Dashboard (EPA): DTXSID70422018

Chemical and physical data
- Formula: C_{17}H_{10}FNO_{2}
- Molar mass: 279.270 g·mol^{−1}
- 3D model (JSmol): Interactive image
- SMILES: C1(=CC2=C(C(=C1)C#N)C=C(C=C2)O)C1=CC(=C(C=C1)O)F
- InChI: InChI=1S/C17H10FNO2/c18-16-7-10(2-4-17(16)21)12-5-11-1-3-14(20)8-15(11)13(6-12)9-19/h1-8,20-21H; Key:NSSOSHDCWCMNDM-UHFFFAOYSA-N

ERB-196, also known as WAY-202196, is a synthetic nonsteroidal estrogen that acts as a highly selective agonist of the ERβ. It possesses 78-fold selectivity for the ERβ over the ERα. The drug was under development by Wyeth for the treatment of inflammation and sepsis starting in 2004 but development was discontinued by 2011.

== See also ==
- 8β-VE2
- Diarylpropionitrile
- FERb 033
- Prinaberel
- WAY-166818
- WAY-200070
- WAY-214156
