= WAY-200070 =

Chemical compound

Clinical data
- ATC code: None

Identifiers
- IUPAC name: 4-(7-Bromo-5-hydroxy-3H-1,3-benzoxazol-2-ylidene)cyclohexa-2,5-dien-1-one
- CAS Number: 440122-66-7
- PubChem CID: 135418373
- ChemSpider: 11193044
- UNII: LK94JP5JT7
- CompTox Dashboard (EPA): DTXSID80432027

Chemical and physical data
- Formula: C_{13}H_{8}BrNO_{3}
- Molar mass: 306.115 g·mol^{−1}
- 3D model (JSmol): Interactive image
- SMILES: C1=CC(=CC=C1C2=NC3=CC(=CC(=C3O2)Br)O)O
- InChI: InChI=1S/C13H8BrNO3/c14-10-5-9(17)6-11-12(10)18-13(15-11)7-1-3-8(16)4-2-7/h1-6,16-17H; Key:BAAILVWEAXFTSF-UHFFFAOYSA-N

WAY-200070 is a synthetic, nonsteroidal, highly selective agonist of ERβ. It possesses 68-fold selectivity for ERβ over ERα (EC_{50} = 2 nM and 155 nM, respectively). WAY-200070 has been found to enhance serotonergic and dopaminergic neurotransmission in the central nervous system, and produces antidepressant- and anxiolytic-like effects in animals. It has been proposed as a potential novel antidepressant/anxiolytic agent. WAY-200070 has also been found to produce antidiabetic effects in animals, and may also be beneficial for the treatment of certain inflammatory conditions.

Due to its selectivity for ERβ, WAY-200070 is inactive in various assays of classic estrogen action, such as uterotrophic and osteopenia. Moreover, WAY-200070 does not affect luteinizing hormone or follicle-stimulating hormone or inhibit ovulation, indicating that it does not suppress the hypothalamic-pituitary-gonadal axis, and as ERα and not ERβ is implicated in breast development, would not be expected to cause growth of the breasts at doses that are selective for activation of ERβ. In fact, ERβ activation may actually suppress breast growth, and in accordance with this, WAY-200070 was shown to augment the efficacy of tamoxifen in in vitro models of breast cancer. As such, WAY-200070 and other selective ERβ agonists might prove to be safe and tolerable for medical use in both premenopausal and postmenopausal women and in individuals of either sex.

== See also ==
- Diarylpropionitrile
- ERB-196
- Erteberel
- FERb 033
- Prinaberel
- WAY-166818
- WAY-214156
