= Diarylpropionitrile =

Chemical compound

Clinical data
- Other names: SC-4473

Identifiers
- IUPAC name: 2,3-bis(4-hydroxyphenyl)propanenitrile
- CAS Number: 1428-67-7
- PubChem CID: 102614
- ChemSpider: 92686
- UNII: 52XWB8Q4V8
- CompTox Dashboard (EPA): DTXSID0040387
- ECHA InfoCard: 100.159.105

Chemical and physical data
- Formula: C_{15}H_{13}NO_{2}
- Molar mass: 239.274 g·mol^{−1}
- 3D model (JSmol): Interactive image
- SMILES: C1=CC(=CC=C1CC(C#N)C2=CC=C(C=C2)O)O
- InChI: InChI=1S/C15H13NO2/c16-10-13(12-3-7-15(18)8-4-12)9-11-1-5-14(17)6-2-11/h1-8,13,17-18H,9H2; Key:GHZHWDWADLAOIQ-UHFFFAOYSA-N

Diarylpropionitrile (DPN), also known as 2,3-bis(p-hydroxyphenyl)propionitrile (2,3-BHPPN), is a synthetic, nonsteroidal, and highly selective agonist of ERβ (IC_{50} = 15 nM) that is used widely in scientific research to study the function of this receptor. It is 70-fold more selective for ERβ over ERα, and has 100-fold lower affinity for GPER (GPR30) relative to estradiol. DPN produces antidepressant- and anxiolytic-like effects in animals via activation of the endogenous oxytocin system. First reported in 2001, DPN was the first selective ERβ agonist to be discovered, and was followed by prinaberel (ERB-041, WAY-202041), WAY-200070, and 8β-VE2 in 2004, ERB-196 (WAY-202196) in 2005, and certain phytoestrogens like liquiritigenin and nyasol (cis-hinokiresinol) since 2007.

DPN is a racemic mixture of two enantiomers, (R)-DPN and (S)-DPN. Relative to (R)-DPN, (S)-DPN has between 3- and 7-fold higher affinity for ERβ and appears to have higher intrinsic activity in activating ERβ. However, both enantiomers have very high affinity, potency, selectivity for ERβ and efficaciously activate ERβ. In any case, it has been suggested that (S)-DPN might be the preferred enantiomer to use for scientific research.

== See also ==
- ERB-196
- Erteberel
- Menerba
- WAY-166818
- WAY-214156
