= Prinaberel =

Chemical compound

Clinical data
- ATC code: None

Identifiers
- IUPAC name: (4Z)-2-Fluoro-4-(5-hydroxy-7-vinyl-1,3-benzoxazol-2(3H)-ylidene)-2,5-cyclohexadien-1-one
- CAS Number: 524684-52-4
- PubChem CID: 5326893
- ChemSpider: 4484184
- UNII: A9C8MNF7CA
- CompTox Dashboard (EPA): DTXSID301030354
- ECHA InfoCard: 100.222.969

Chemical and physical data
- Formula: C_{15}H_{10}FNO_{3}
- Molar mass: 271.247 g·mol^{−1}
- 3D model (JSmol): Interactive image
- SMILES: O=C3\C=C/C(=C2/Oc1c(cc(O)cc1N2)\C=C)/C=C3/F
- InChI: InChI=1S/C15H10FNO3/c1-2-8-5-10(18)7-12-14(8)20-15(17-12)9-3-4-13(19)11(16)6-9/h2-7,17-18H,1H2/b15-9-; Key:FCXYSEXZEGPLGG-DHDCSXOGSA-N

Prinaberel (INN, USAN) (developmental code names ERB-041, WAY-202041) is a synthetic, nonsteroidal, and highly selective agonist of the ERβ subtype of the estrogen receptor. It is used in scientific research to elucidate the role of the ERβ receptor. Studies have indicated that selective ERβ agonists like prinaberel could be useful in the clinical treatment of a variety of medical conditions including inflammatory bowel disease, rheumatoid arthritis, endometriosis, and sepsis. Accordingly, prinaberel either was or still is under investigation by Wyeth for the treatment of some of these conditions.

== See also ==
- Diarylpropionitrile
- ERB-196
- Erteberel
- WAY-200070
- WAY-214156
