= Erteberel =

Chemical compound

Clinical data
- Other names: Selective estrogen receptor beta agonist-1; SERBA-1; LY-500307; (3aS,4R,9bR)-1,2,3,3a,4,9b-Hexahydro-4-(4-hydroxyphenyl)cyclopenta(c)(1)benzopyran-8-ol; (2R,3S,4R)-SERBA
- Routes of administration: By mouth

Identifiers
- IUPAC name: (3aS,4R,9bR)-4-(4-Hydroxyphenyl)-1,2,3,3a,4,9b-hexahydrocyclopenta[c]chromen-8-ol
- CAS Number: 533884-09-2
- PubChem CID: 10286159
- DrugBank: DB07933
- ChemSpider: 8461628
- UNII: 2ZUL6758TZ
- KEGG: D09899
- ChEBI: CHEBI:231600
- ChEMBL: ChEMBL278703
- CompTox Dashboard (EPA): DTXSID70201547

Chemical and physical data
- Formula: C_{18}H_{18}O_{3}
- Molar mass: 282.339 g·mol^{−1}
- 3D model (JSmol): Interactive image
- SMILES: C1C[C@H]2[C@@H](C1)C3=C(C=CC(=C3)O)O[C@H]2C4=CC=C(C=C4)O
- InChI: InChI=1S/C18H18O3/c19-12-6-4-11(5-7-12)18-15-3-1-2-14(15)16-10-13(20)8-9-17(16)21-18/h4-10,14-15,18-20H,1-3H2/t14-,15+,18+/m1/s1; Key:XIESSJVMWNJCGZ-VKJFTORMSA-N

Erteberel (INN, USAN; former developmental code name LY-500307; also known as selective estrogen receptor beta agonist-1 or SERBA-1) is a synthetic, nonsteroidal estrogen which acts as a selective ERβ agonist and was under development by Eli Lilly for the treatment of schizophrenia. It was specifically under investigation for the treatment of negative symptoms and cognitive impairment associated with the condition. It managed to reach phase II clinical trials for this indication in the United States in 2015. As of 2021 development has been discontinued. Erteberel was also under investigation for the treatment of benign prostatic hyperplasia and reached phase II clinical studies for this use but failed to improve symptoms in men with the condition and development for this indication was discontinued. The drug has also been proposed as a potential novel treatment for glioblastoma.

Erteberel has 14-fold binding selectivity for the ERβ over the ERα (K_{i} = 0.19 nM versus 2.68 nM, respectively). However, it shows 32-fold functional selectivity for activation of the ERβ over the ERα (EC_{50} = 0.66 nM versus 19.4 nM, respectively). It is roughly a full agonist of both the ERβ and ERα (E_{max} = 101% versus 94%, respectively). Although selective for the ERβ, erteberel loses its selectivity at high dosages and activates the ERα as well, producing effects such as suppression of gonadal testosterone production in men.

== See also ==
- List of investigational sex-hormonal agents § Estrogenics
- List of investigational antipsychotics
- Estrogen receptor beta § Agonists
