= Worta McCaskill-Stevens =

American physician-scientist (1949–2023)

Worta McCaskill-Stevens MD, MS
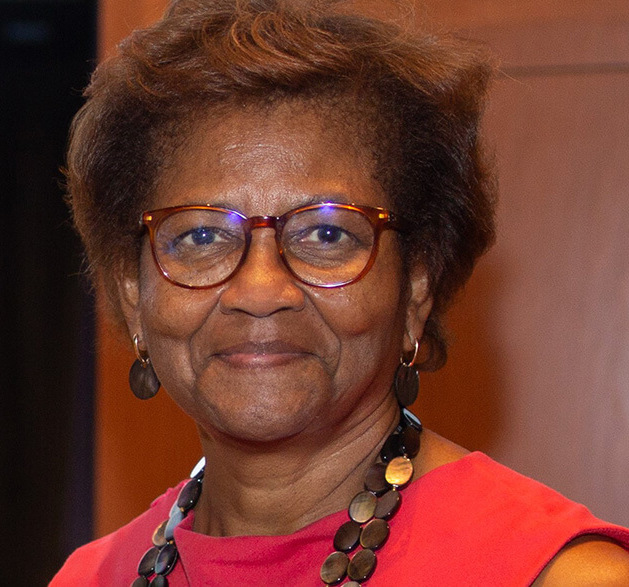
- Born: July 26, 1949; Louisburg, North Carolina, U.S.
- Died: November 15, 2023 (aged 74)
- Education: Washington University in St. Louis (BA); Georgetown University School of Medicine (MD); Georgetown University (MS)
- Known for: NCI Community Oncology Research Program (NCORP); STAR Trial (Tamoxifen and Raloxifene); Breast cancer prevention research
- Awards: AACR Distinguished Public Service Award (2024); Jane Cooke Wright Memorial Lectureship (2016); NCI Merit Award (2011); NIH Director’s Award (2009); Honorary Doctor of Science, Georgetown (2017); David King Community Clinical Scientist Award (2020)
- Scientific career
- Fields: Medical oncology, Cancer prevention, Health equity, Clinical trials
- Workplaces: National Cancer Institute (NCI); National Institutes of Health (NIH)

Worta J. McCaskill-Stevens (July 26, 1949 – November 15, 2023) was an American medical oncologist and a senior investigator at the National Cancer Institute (NCI). She was a leading authority on cancer prevention, clinical trials, and health equity. McCaskill-Stevens is best known for her leadership of the **NCI Community Oncology Research Program (NCORP)**, where, as Chief of the Community Oncology and Prevention Trials Research Group, she oversaw clinical cancer research in community settings across the United States and Internationally.

She initially gained international recognition as the program director for the **STAR Trial** (Study of Tamoxifen and Raloxifene), a landmark study involving nearly 20,000 women that shaped modern protocols for breast cancer risk reduction. Throughout her career, McCaskill-Stevens championed the inclusion of racial and ethnic minorities in clinical trials, working to address systemic disparities in cancer outcomes. In 2023, the NCI established the *Worta McCaskill-Stevens Career Development Award* in her honor to fund future research in community oncology.

== Early life and education ==
McCaskill-Stevens was born in Louisburg, North Carolina on July 26, 1949. She attended Washington University in St. Louis and the American College of Switzerland. McCaskill-Stevens worked as an intern for Time and as a medical editor for Marcel Dekker and the Guttmacher Institute. At Georgetown University School of Medicine, she started medical school at age 30, earning a M.D. in 1985 and completing an internal medicine residency. McCaskill-Stevens did a medical oncology fellowship at the Mayo Clinic.

== Career and research ==
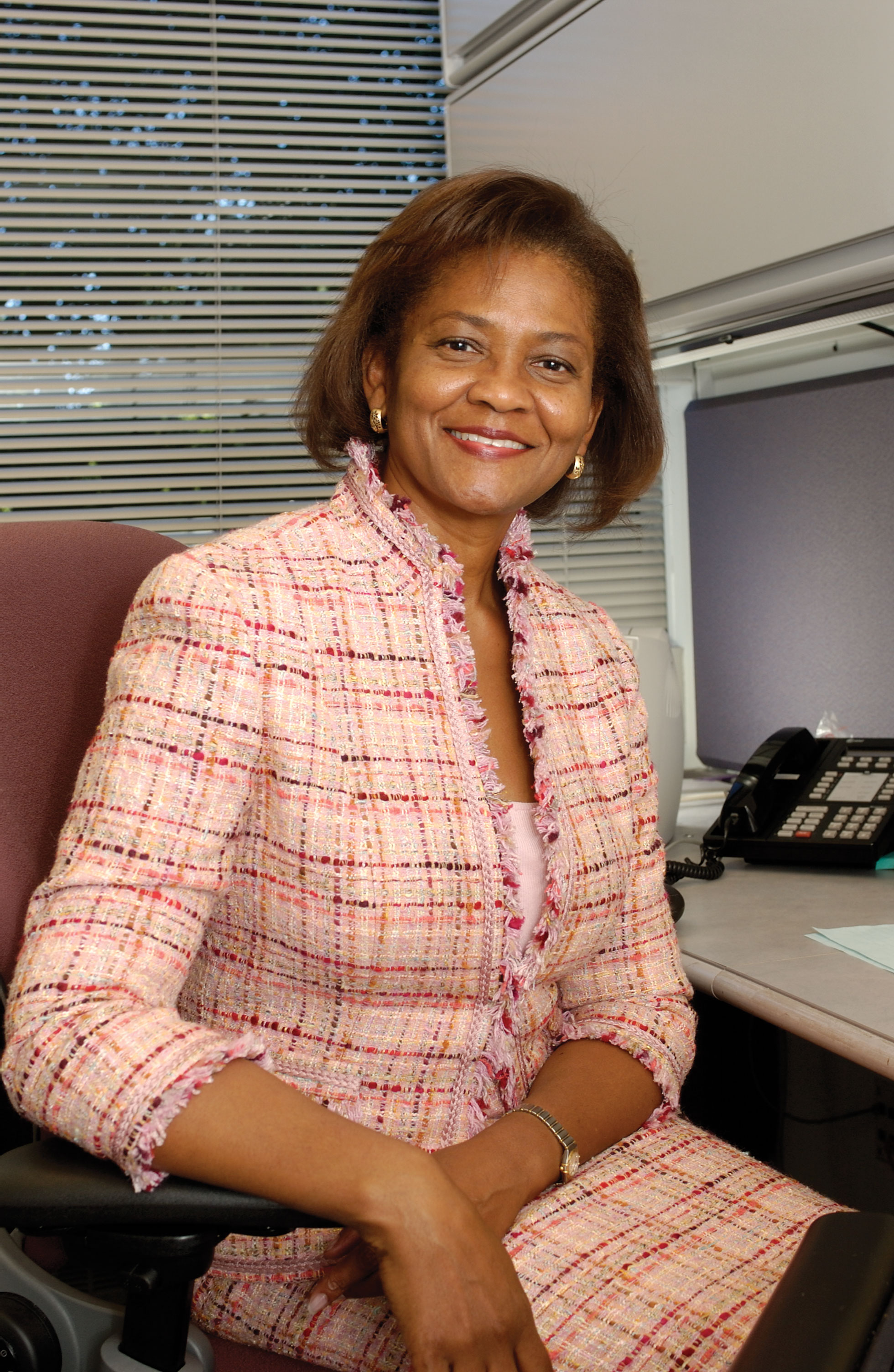
McCaskill-Stevens at the National Cancer Institute pre-2013

McCaskill-Stevens, a medical oncologist, joined the National Cancer Institute (NCI) in 1998 as the program director for the study of tamoxifen and raloxifene (STAR), and assumed responsibilities for breast cancer prevention with the community clinical oncology program (CCOP). She chaired the 2009 National Institutes of Health (NIH) State-of-the Science Conference on ductal carcinoma in situ; was a member of the early breast cancer clinical trialist group in Oxford; and was a member of NCI's breast cancer steering committee. McCaskill-Stevens co-directed the breast care and research center at the Indiana University Cancer Center.

McCaskill-Stevens was chief of the community oncology and prevention trials research group, which houses the NCI community oncology research program (NCORP), a community-based clinical trials network launched in 2014. As NCORP director, she oversaw the program supporting community hospitals, physicians and others to participate in NCI-approved cancer treatment, prevention, screening, and control clinical trials, as well as cancer care delivery studies.

McCaskill-Stevens' interests included cancer disparities research both nationally and internationally, management of comorbidities within clinical trials and molecular research that helps to identify those individuals who will best benefit from cancer prevention interventions. She worked with the Study of Tamoxifen and Raloxifene (STAR), as the program director.

== Selected publications ==
McCaskill-Stevens authored or co-authored over 100 scientific papers, with a specific focus on breast cancer prevention, clinical trial recruitment, and minority health.

- Vogel VG, Costantino JP, Wickerham DL, McCaskill-Stevens W, et al. (2006). "Effects of tamoxifen vs raloxifene on the risk of developing invasive breast cancer and other disease outcomes: the NSABP Study of Tamoxifen and Raloxifene (STAR) P-2 trial". JAMA. 295 (23): 2727–2741. doi:10.1001/jama.295.23.2727. PMID 16754727.
- McCaskill-Stevens W, et al. (2014). "Cancer Care Delivery Research: Building the Evidence Base to Support Practice Change in Community Oncology". Journal of Clinical Oncology. 32. doi:10.1200/JCO.2014.32.15_suppl.6002.
- Díaz EG, McCaskill-Stevens W, O'Keefe T, et al. (2021). "Initial reporting from the prospective National Cancer Institute (NCI) COVID-19 in Cancer Patients Study (NCCAPS)". Cancer. doi:10.1002/cncr.33863.
- Allegra CJ, McCaskill-Stevens W, Steinberg SM, et al. (2012). "NIH State-of-the-Science Conference Statement: Diagnosis and Management of Ductal Carcinoma In Situ (DCIS)". Journal of the National Cancer Institute. doi:10.1093/jnci/djr525.

== Awards and honors ==
McCaskill-Stevens received numerous awards for her leadership in oncology and her commitment to health equity.

- 2024: American Association for Cancer Research (AACR) Distinguished Public Service Award for Lifetime Achievement in Cancer Research (Posthumous)
- 2020: David King Community Clinical Scientist Award from the Association of Community Cancer Centers (ACCC).
- 2017: Honorary Doctor of Science from Georgetown University.
- 2016: AACR Jane Cooke Wright Memorial Lectureship.
- 2013: Listed on Ebony's Power 100 – Most Influential African Americans in Science and Health.
- 2011: NCI Merit Award for breast cancer prevention.
- 2009: NIH Director's Award for Clinical Trials.
- 2009: NIH On-the-Spot Award for meritorious service to NCI goals.
- 1985: Sarah E. Steward Award for Leadership in Medicine (Georgetown University School of Medicine).
- 1985: Kaiser Family Fund Award for Excellence in Academic Achievement and Leadership in Medicine.
- Member of the Omega Alpha Medical Honor Society.

== Legacy ==
Following her death in 2023, the National Cancer Institute established the NCI Worta McCaskill-Stevens Career Development Award for Community Oncology and Prevention Research (K12). This permanent grant mechanism was created to honor her commitment to health equity and is designed to train clinical scientists who focus on community oncology.

In late 2023, the Alliance for Clinical Trials in Oncology renamed its annual health disparities meeting the Worta McCaskill-Stevens, MD, MS Health Disparities Symposium.

== Personal life ==
McCaskill-Stevens died on November 15, 2023.
