= C14H11N =

The molecular formula C_{14}H_{11}N may refer to:

- Anthramine
- Dibenzazepine (iminostilbene)
- Diphenylacetonitrile
- 2-Methyl-6-(phenylethynyl)pyridine (MPEP)
- 2-Phenylindole
- N-Vinylcarbazole
