= C17H17NO2 =

The molecular formula C_{17}H_{17}NO_{2} may refer to:

- Apomorphine
- Asimilobine
- Dihydrexidine
- D-15414
- Etazepine
- meso-Butestrol
