= Pipendoxifene =

Chemical compound

Clinical data
- Other names: ERA-923

Identifiers
- IUPAC name: 2-(4-hydroxyphenyl)-3-methyl-1-[[4-(2-piperidin-1-ylethoxy)phenyl]methyl]indol-5-ol
- CAS Number: 198480-55-6
- PubChem CID: 6433099
- ChemSpider: 4938287
- UNII: TPC5Q8496G
- ChEMBL: ChEMBL44426
- CompTox Dashboard (EPA): DTXSID40870209

Chemical and physical data
- Formula: C_{29}H_{32}N_{2}O_{3}
- Molar mass: 456.586 g·mol^{−1}
- 3D model (JSmol): Interactive image
- SMILES: CC1=C(N(C2=C1C=C(C=C2)O)CC3=CC=C(C=C3)OCCN4CCCCC4)C5=CC=C(C=C5)O
- InChI: InChI=1S/C29H32N2O3/c1-21-27-19-25(33)11-14-28(27)31(29(21)23-7-9-24(32)10-8-23)20-22-5-12-26(13-6-22)34-18-17-30-15-3-2-4-16-30/h5-14,19,32-33H,2-4,15-18,20H2,1H3; Key:JICOGKJOQXTAIP-UHFFFAOYSA-N

Pipendoxifene (INN; developmental code ERA-923) is a nonsteroidal selective estrogen receptor modulator (SERM) that was under development by Ligand Pharmaceuticals and Wyeth-Ayerst Laboratories (now Wyeth) for the treatment of breast cancer but was not marketed. It is a member of the 2-phenylindole group of SERMs and is structurally related to zindoxifene and the marketed bazedoxifene. The drug reached phase II clinical trials before its development was discontinued. It was synthesized at the same time as bazedoxifene and was intended as a backup drug for bazedoxifene, only to be developed further if bazedoxifene had failed in clinical trials. No further development was reported after 2002 and it was formally announced that development had been terminated in November 2005.

Unlike the SERM raloxifene, pipendoxifene is devoid of uterotrophic activity in immature/ovariectomized rodents.
