= 2-Phenyl-1-benzothiophene =

Chemical compound

Names
- Preferred IUPAC name 2-Phenyl-1-benzothiophene
- Other names: 2-Phenylbenzo[b]thiophene; 2-Phenylthianaphthene

Identifiers
CAS Number	1207-95-0
3D model (JSmol)	Interactive image
ChEMBL	ChEMBL1643183
ChemSpider	531030
PubChem CID	610886
- InChI: InChI=1S/C14H10S/c1-2-6-11(7-3-1)14-10-12-8-4-5-9-13(12)15-14/h1-10H Key: LBMHPHUSGIEGHJ-UHFFFAOYSA-N
- SMILES: C1=CC=C(C=C1)C2=CC3=CC=CC=C3S2

Properties
Chemical formula	C_{14}H_{10}S
Molar mass	210.29 g·mol^{−1}
Melting point	171.5 °C (340.7 °F; 444.6 K)
- Except where otherwise noted, data are given for materials in their standard state (at 25 °C [77 °F], 100 kPa). Infobox references

2-Phenyl-1-benzothiophene is an aromatic chemical compound commonly used as an intermediate in the production of medication. Derivatives of the compound are present in drugs used to treat Alzheimer's disease, and its structure is present in the selective estrogen receptor modulator drugs raloxifene and arzoxifene. Its formula is C_{14}H_{10}S.

2-Phenyl-1-benzothiophene is an intermediate in pesticide synthesis, in addition to its uses in the pharmaceutical field. Typically, it is produced through three methods: an arylation reaction of benzothiophene; a coupling reaction between 2-benzothiophene boronic acid and a benzene-donating compound; or cyclization of aromatic molecules.
