= Bazedoxifene =

Selective estrogen receptor modulator

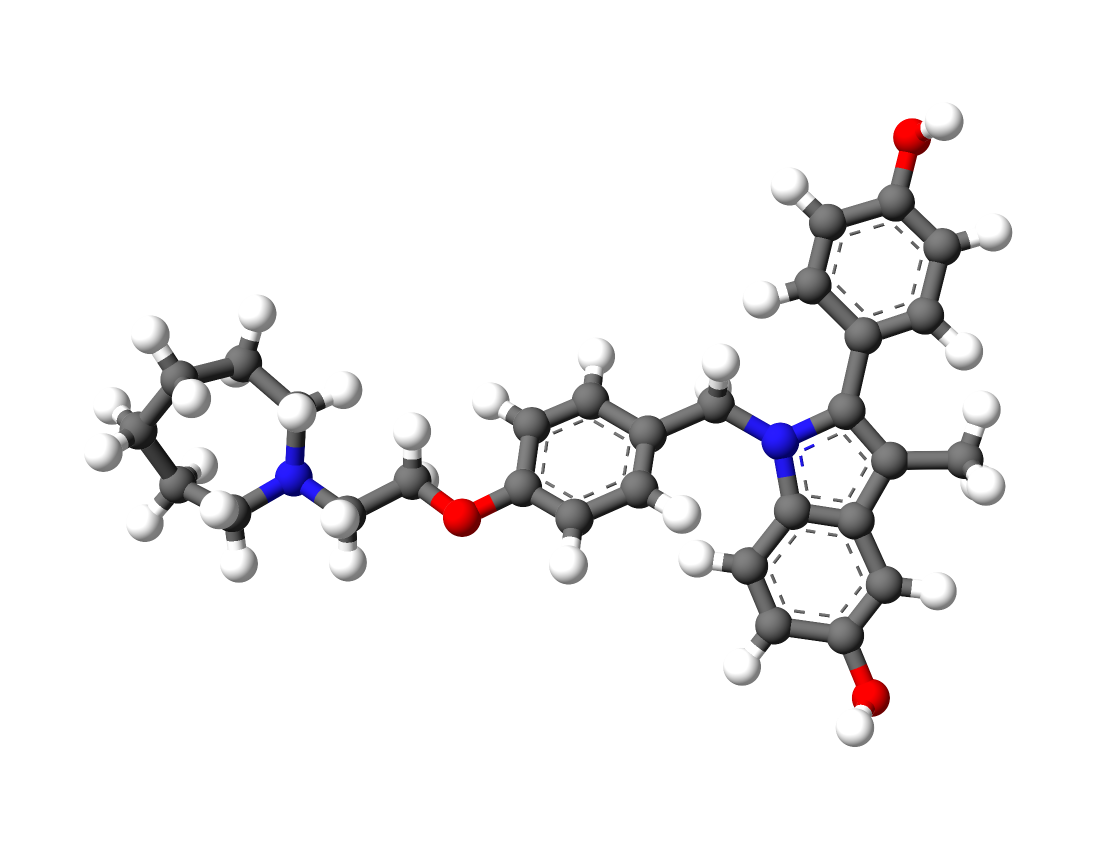

Clinical data
- Pronunciation: /beɪzɛˈdɒksɪfiːn/ bay-zeh-DOX-ih-feen
- Trade names: Conbriza, Duavee, Duavive, Viviant
- Other names: TSE-424; WAY-140424; WAY-TSE-424
- AHFS/Drugs.com: International Drug Names
- License data: EU EMA: by INN
- Routes of administration: By mouth
- ATC code: G03XC02 (WHO)

Legal status
- Legal status: In general: ℞ (Prescription only)

Identifiers
- IUPAC name: 1-[4-[2-(azepan-1-yl)ethoxy]benzyl]-2-(4-hydroxyphenyl)-3-methyl-1H-indol-5-ol
- CAS Number: 198481-32-2
- PubChem CID: 154257
- IUPHAR/BPS: 7355
- DrugBank: DB06401
- ChemSpider: 135921
- UNII: Q16TT9C5BK
- ChEMBL: ChEMBL46740
- PDB ligand: 29S (PDBe, RCSB PDB)
- CompTox Dashboard (EPA): DTXSID70173593
- ECHA InfoCard: 100.232.728

Chemical and physical data
- Formula: C_{30}H_{34}N_{2}O_{3}
- Molar mass: 470.613 g·mol^{−1}
- 3D model (JSmol): Interactive image
- SMILES: Oc1ccc(cc1)c3c(c2cc(O)ccc2n3Cc5ccc(OCCN4CCCCCC4)cc5)C
- InChI: InChI=1S/C30H34N2O3/c1-22-28-20-26(34)12-15-29(28)32(30(22)24-8-10-25(33)11-9-24)21-23-6-13-27(14-7-23)35-19-18-31-16-4-2-3-5-17-31/h6-15,20,33-34H,2-5,16-19,21H2,1H3; Key:UCJGJABZCDBEDK-UHFFFAOYSA-N

Bazedoxifene, used as bazedoxifene acetate, is a medication for bone problems and possibly (pending more study) for cancer. It is a third-generation selective estrogen receptor modulator (SERM). Since late 2013 it has had U.S. FDA approval for bazedoxifene as part of the combination drug Duavee in the prevention (not treatment) of postmenopausal osteoporosis. It is also being studied for possible treatment of breast cancer and pancreatic cancer.

== Medical uses ==
Bazedoxifene is used in the prevention of postmenopausal osteoporosis.

Osteoporosis represents a major public health concern, especially as the number of postmenopausal women continues to rise. As a result, the need for innovative treatments has become increasingly important. Bazedoxifene (BZA) has emerged as a promising option for postmenopausal osteoporosis due to its demonstrated effectiveness in reducing bone loss and fractures, as well as its strong safety and tolerability profile. For women who cannot or prefer not to use bisphosphonates, owing to gastrointestinal side effects, safety risks, or contraindications, selective estrogen receptor modulators (SERMs) like BZA may serve as a suitable alternative. SERMs may also benefit younger women who are at higher risk of fractures and require long-term treatment.

Furthermore, BZA has been paired with conjugated estrogens (TSEC) for both osteoporosis prevention and the management of menopausal symptoms. Given its positive safety record and efficacy in preventing fractures, BZA is becoming an increasingly important option within the current landscape of osteoporosis therapies.

=== Available forms ===
Bazedoxifene is marketed both alone and in combination with conjugated estrogens.

== Pharmacology ==
=== Pharmacodynamics ===
Bazedoxifene is a selective estrogen receptor modulator (SERM), or a mixed agonist and antagonist of the estrogen receptor (ER) in different tissues.

Tissue-specific estrogenic and antiestrogenic activity of SERMs
Medication	Breast	Bone	Liver				Uterus	Vagina	Brain	
Medication	Breast	Bone	Lipids	Coagulation	SHBG	IGF-1	Uterus	Vagina	Hot flashes	Gonadotropins
Estradiol	+	+	+	+	+	+	+	+	+	+
"Ideal SERM"	–	+	+	±	±	±	–	+	+	±
Bazedoxifene	–	+	+	+	+	?	–	±	–	?
Clomifene	–	+	+	?	+	+	–	?	–	±
Lasofoxifene	–	+	+	+	?	?	±	±	–	?
Ospemifene	–	+	+	+	+	+	±	±	–	±
Raloxifene	–	+	+	+	+	+	±	–	–	±
Tamoxifen	–	+	+	+	+	+	+	–	–	±
Toremifene	–	+	+	+	+	+	+	–	–	±
Effect: + = Estrogenic / agonistic. ± = Mixed or neutral. – = Antiestrogenic / antagonistic. Note: SERMs generally increase gonadotropin levels in hypogonadal and eugonadal men as well as premenopausal women (antiestrogenic) but decrease gonadotropin levels in postmenopausal women (estrogenic). Sources: See template.

== Chemistry ==
The drug is a member of the 2-phenylindole group of SERMs, along with zindoxifene and pipendoxifene.

== History ==
=== Approval ===
The drug was approved in the European Union by the European Medicines Agency on April 27, 2009.

== Society and culture ==
=== Brand names ===
Bazedoxifene is marketed alone under the brand names Conbriza and Viviant and in combination with conjugated estrogens under the brand names Duavee and Duavive.

== See also ==
- Bazedoxifene/conjugated estrogens
