= Bazedoxifene/conjugated estrogens =

Combination drug

Combination of
- Bazedoxifene: Selective estrogen receptor modulator
- Conjugated estrogens: Estrogen

Clinical data
- Trade names: Duavee, Duavive
- AHFS/Drugs.com: Professional Drug Facts
- MedlinePlus: a614004
- License data: US DailyMed: Duavee
- Pregnancy category: AU: D
- Routes of administration: By mouth
- ATC code: G03CC07 (WHO)

Legal status
- Legal status: CA: ℞-only; US: ℞-only; EU: Rx-only; In general: ℞ (Prescription only)

Identifiers
- CAS Number: 1422348-02-4
- ChemSpider: None
- KEGG: D10579

Bazedoxifene/conjugated estrogens, sold under the brand name Duavee among others, is a fixed-dose combination medication for the treatment of menopause symptoms and postmenopausal osteoporosis. It contains the selective estrogen receptor modulator bazedoxifene and conjugated estrogens. It is taken by mouth.

The combination was approved for medical use in the United States in October 2013, and in the European Union in December 2014.

== See also ==
- List of combined sex-hormonal preparations
