= Toremifene =

Chemical compound

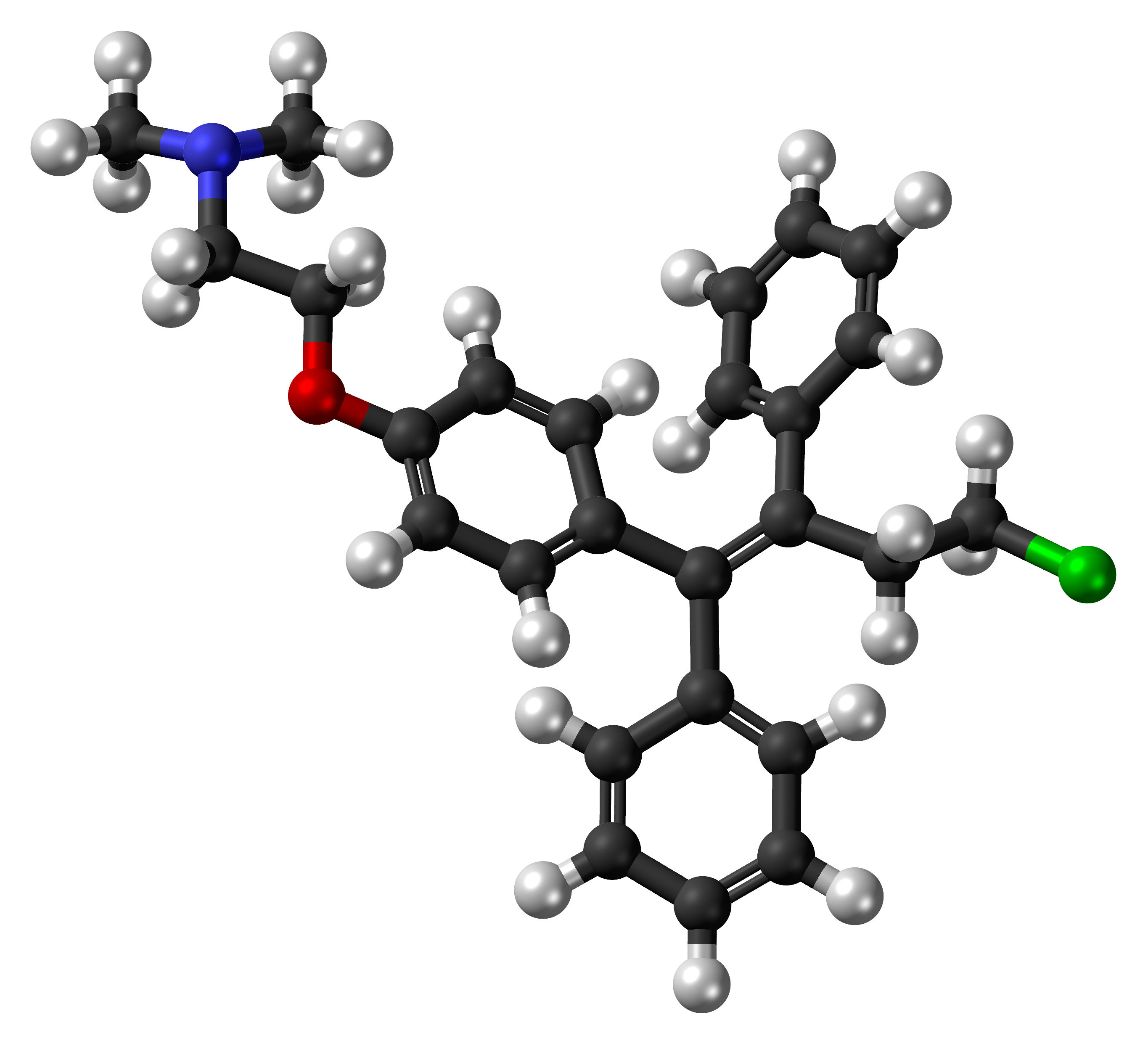

Clinical data
- Pronunciation: /ˈtɔːrəmɪfiːn/
- Trade names: Fareston, others
- Other names: (Z)-Toremifene; 4-Chlorotamoxifen; 4-CT; Acapodene; CCRIS-8745; FC-1157; FC-1157a; GTx-006; NK-622; NSC-613680
- AHFS/Drugs.com: Monograph
- MedlinePlus: a608003
- License data: EU EMA: by INN
- Routes of administration: By mouth
- Drug class: Selective estrogen receptor modulator
- ATC code: L02BA02 (WHO)

Pharmacokinetic data
- Bioavailability: Good/~100%
- Protein binding: 99.7%
- Metabolism: Liver (CYP3A4)
- Metabolites: N-Desmethyltoremifene; 4-Hydroxytoremifene; Ospemifene
- Elimination half-life: Toremifene: 3–7 days Metabolites: 4–21 days
- Excretion: Feces: 70% (as metabolites)

Identifiers
- IUPAC name: 2-[4-[(1Z)-4-Chloro-1,2-diphenyl-but-1-en-1-yl]phenoxy]-N,N-dimethylethanamine
- CAS Number: 89778-26-7 89778-27-8 (citrate)
- PubChem CID: 3005573
- IUPHAR/BPS: 4325
- DrugBank: DB00539
- ChemSpider: 2275722
- UNII: 7NFE54O27T
- KEGG: D08620
- ChEBI: CHEBI:9635
- ChEMBL: ChEMBL1655
- PDB ligand: T0R (PDBe, RCSB PDB)
- CompTox Dashboard (EPA): DTXSID3023689
- ECHA InfoCard: 100.125.139

Chemical and physical data
- Formula: C_{26}H_{28}ClNO
- Molar mass: 405.97 g·mol^{−1}
- 3D model (JSmol): Interactive image
- SMILES: ClCCC(/c1ccccc1)=C(/c2ccc(OCCN(C)C)cc2)c3ccccc3
- InChI: InChI=1S/C26H28ClNO/c1-28(2)19-20-29-24-15-13-23(14-16-24)26(22-11-7-4-8-12-22)25(17-18-27)21-9-5-3-6-10-21/h3-16H,17-20H2,1-2H3/b26-25-; Key:XFCLJVABOIYOMF-QPLCGJKRSA-N

Toremifene, sold under the brand name Fareston among others, is a medication which is used in the treatment of advanced breast cancer in postmenopausal women. It is taken by mouth.

Side effects of toremifene include hot flashes, sweating, nausea, vomiting, dizziness, vaginal discharge, and vaginal bleeding. It can also cause blood clots, irregular heartbeat, cataracts, visual disturbances, elevated liver enzymes, endometrial hyperplasia, and endometrial cancer. High blood calcium levels can occur in women with bone metastases.

The medication is a selective estrogen receptor modulator (SERM) and hence is a mixed agonist–antagonist of the estrogen receptor (ER), the biological target of estrogens like estradiol. It has estrogenic effects in bone, the liver, and the uterus and antiestrogenic effects in the breasts. It is a triphenylethylene derivative and is closely related to tamoxifen.

Toremifene was introduced for medical use in 1997. It was the first antiestrogen to be introduced since tamoxifen in 1978. It is available as a generic medication in the United States.

== Medical uses ==
Toremifene is approved for the treatment of metastatic breast cancer in postmenopausal women with estrogen receptor-positive or unknown-status tumors. This is its only approved use in the United States. It shows equivalent effectiveness to tamoxifen for this indication. Toremifene has been found to be effective in the treatment of breast pain and may be a more effective medication than tamoxifen for this indication. It also has superior effects on bone mineral density and lipid profile, including levels of cholesterol and triglycerides, compared to tamoxifen. Toremifene has been reported to significantly improve symptoms of gynecomastia in men.

=== Available forms ===
Toremifene is provided in the form of 60 mg oral tablets.

== Side effects ==
The side effects of toremifene are similar to those of tamoxifen. The most common side effect is hot flashes. Other side effects include sweating, nausea, vomiting, dizziness, vaginal discharge, and vaginal bleeding. In women with bone metastases, hypercalcemia may occur. Toremifene has a small risk of thromboembolic events. Cataracts, vision changes, and elevation of liver enzymes have been reported. The drug prolongs the QT interval and hence has a risk of potentially fatal dysrhythmias. The risk of dysrhythmias can be reduced by avoiding use in patients with hypokalemia, hypomagnesemia, pre-existing QT prolongation, and in those taking other QT-prolonging drugs. Because toremifene has estrogenic actions in the uterus, it can increase the risk of endometrial hyperplasia and endometrial cancer.

Toremifene appears to be safer than tamoxifen. It has a lower risk of venous thromboembolism (VTE) (e.g., pulmonary embolism), stroke, and cataracts. The lower risk of VTE may be related to the fact tamoxifen decreases levels of the antithrombin III to a significantly greater extent than either 60 or 200 mg/day toremifene.

== Interactions ==
Toremifene is a substrate of CYP3A4, a cytochrome P450 enzyme, and hence drugs that induce or inhibit this enzyme can respectively decrease or increase levels of toremifene in the body. In 2025, toremifene, along with the structurally related molecules tamoxifen and clomiphene, was reported to interact with tubulin and inhibit its polymerization.

== Pharmacology ==
=== Pharmacodynamics ===
Toremifene is a selective estrogen receptor modulator (SERM). That is, it is a selective mixed agonist–antagonist of the estrogen receptors (ERs), with estrogenic actions in some tissues and antiestrogenic actions in other tissues. The medication has estrogenic effects in bone, partial estrogenic effects in the uterus and liver, and antiestrogenic effects in the breasts.

Tissue-specific estrogenic and antiestrogenic activity of SERMs
Medication	Breast	Bone	Liver				Uterus	Vagina	Brain	
Medication	Breast	Bone	Lipids	Coagulation	SHBG	IGF-1	Uterus	Vagina	Hot flashes	Gonadotropins
Estradiol	+	+	+	+	+	+	+	+	+	+
"Ideal SERM"	–	+	+	±	±	±	–	+	+	±
Bazedoxifene	–	+	+	+	+	?	–	±	–	?
Clomifene	–	+	+	?	+	+	–	?	–	±
Lasofoxifene	–	+	+	+	?	?	±	±	–	?
Ospemifene	–	+	+	+	+	+	±	±	–	±
Raloxifene	–	+	+	+	+	+	±	–	–	±
Tamoxifen	–	+	+	+	+	+	+	–	–	±
Toremifene	–	+	+	+	+	+	+	–	–	±
Effect: + = Estrogenic / agonistic. ± = Mixed or neutral. – = Antiestrogenic / antagonistic. Note: SERMs generally increase gonadotropin levels in hypogonadal and eugonadal men as well as premenopausal women (antiestrogenic) but decrease gonadotropin levels in postmenopausal women (estrogenic). Sources: See template.

The affinity of toremifene for the ER is similar to that of tamoxifen. In studies using rat ER, toremifene had about 1.4% and tamoxifen had about 1.6% of the affinity of estradiol for the ER. The affinities (K_{i}) of toremifene at the human ERs have been reported as 20.3 ± 0.1 nM for the ERα and 15.4 ± 3.1 nM for the ERβ. In other rat ER studies, toremifene had 3–9% of the affinity of estradiol for the ER while its metabolites N-desmethyltoremifene and 4-hydroxytoremifene had 3–5% and 64–158% of the affinity of estradiol for the ER, respectively. The affinity of another metabolite, 4-hydroxy-N-desmethyltoremifene, was not assessed. 4-Hydroxytoremifene showed about 100-fold higher antiestrogenic potency than toremifene in vitro in one study, but not in another. 4-Hydroxy-N-desmethyltoremifene has also been found to be strongly antiestrogenic in vitro. The metabolites of toremifene, particularly 4-hydroxytoremifene, may contribute importantly to the clinical activity of the medication. On the other hand, some authorities consider toremifene not to be a prodrug.

Toremifene is very similar to tamoxifen and shares most of its properties. There are some indications that toremifene may be safer than tamoxifen as it is not a hepatocarcinogen in animals and may have less potential for genotoxicity. However, clinical studies have found no significant differences between toremifene and tamoxifen, including in terms of effectiveness, tolerability, and safety, and hence the clinical use of toremifene has been somewhat limited. Toremifene is thought to have about one-third of the potency of tamoxifen; i.e., 60 mg toremifene is roughly equivalent to 20 mg tamoxifen in the treatment of breast cancer.

Toremifene has been found to have antigonadotropic effects in postmenopausal women, progonadotropic effects in men, to increase sex hormone-binding globulin levels, and to decrease insulin-like growth factor 1 levels by about 20% in postmenopausal women and men.

In addition to its activity as a SERM, 4-hydroxytoremifene is an antagonist of the estrogen-related receptor γ (ERRγ).

=== Pharmacokinetics ===
==== Absorption ====
The bioavailability of toremifene has not been precisely determined but is known to be good and has been estimated to be approximately 100%. Levels of toremifene at steady state with a dosage of 60 mg/day are 800 to 879 ng/mL. Levels of N-desmethyltoremifene at steady state with toremifene were 3,058 ng/mL at 60 mg/day, 5,942 ng/mL at 200 mg/day, and 11,913 ng/mL at 400 mg/day. Levels of 4-hydroxytoremifene at steady state with toremifene were 438 ng/mL at 200 mg/day and 889 ng/mL at 400 mg/day. Concentrations of toremifene increase linearly across a dose range of 10 to 680 mg.

==== Distribution ====
Toremifene is 99.7% bound to plasma proteins, with 92% bound specifically to albumin, about 6% to β_{1} globulin fraction, and about 2% to a fraction between albumin and α_{1} globulins. The apparent volume of distribution of toremifene ranged from 457 to 958 L.

==== Metabolism ====
Toremifene is metabolized in the liver primarily by CYP3A4 and then undergoes secondary hydroxylation. The metabolites of toremifene include N-desmethyltoremifene, 4-hydroxytoremifene, and 4-hydroxy-N-desmethyltoremifene, among others. Ospemifene (deaminohydroxytoremifene) is also a major metabolite of toremifene.

==== Elimination ====
The elimination half-life of toremifene is 3 to 7 days in healthy individuals. In people with impaired liver function, the half-life is 11 days. The elimination half-lives of the metabolites of toremifene are 5 to 21 days for N-desmethyltoremifene, 5 days for 4-hydroxytoremifene, and 4 days for ospemifene. The long elimination half-lives of toremifene and its metabolites are thought to be due to enterohepatic recirculation and high plasma protein binding. Toremifene is eliminated 70% in the feces, as metabolites.

== Chemistry ==
Toremifene, also known as 4-chlorotamoxifen, is a derivative of triphenylethylene and a close analogue of tamoxifen. It is also closely related to afimoxifene (4-hydroxytamoxifen) and ospemifene (deaminohydroxytoremifene).

== History ==
Toremifene was introduced in the United States in 1997. It was the first antiestrogen to be introduced in this country since tamoxifen in 1978.

== Society and culture ==
=== Generic names ===
Toremifene is the generic name of the drug and its INN and BAN, while toremifene citrate is its USAN and JAN and torémifène is its DCF.

=== Brand names ===
Toremifene is marketed almost exclusively under the brand name Fareston.

=== Availability ===
Toremifene is marketed widely throughout the world and is available in the United States, the United Kingdom, Ireland, many other European countries, South Africa, Australia, New Zealand, and elsewhere throughout the world.

== Research ==
Toremifene was also evaluated for prevention of prostate cancer and had the tentative brand name Acapodene.

In 2007 the pharmaceutical company GTx, Inc was conducting two different phase 3 clinical trials; First, a pivotal Phase clinical trial for the treatment of serious side effects of androgen deprivation therapy (ADT) (especially vertebral/spine fractures and hot flashes, lipid profile, and gynecomastia) for advanced prostate cancer, and second, a pivotal Phase III clinical trial for the prevention of prostate cancer in high risk men with high grade prostatic intraepithelial neoplasia, or PIN. Results of these trials are expected by first quarter of 2008

An NDA for the first application (relief of prostate cancer ADT side effects) was submitted in Feb 2009, and in Oct 2009 the FDA said they would need more clinical data, e.g. another phase III trial.

Ultimately, development was discontinued and toremifene was never marketed for complications associated with ADT or the treatment or prevention of prostate cancer.

Toremifene may be useful in the prevention of bicalutamide-induced gynecomastia.

=== Phase III Trial Results ===
A double-blind, placebo-controlled, randomized, 3 year clinical trial of toremifene was conducted using a sample of 1,260 men. Subjects had a median age of 64 years and were diagnosed with high-grade prostatic intraepithelial neoplasia (HGPIN), which is considered premalignant, though Thompson and Leach feel a low grade PIN could also be deemed premalignant.

The sponsor, GTx, who designed and managed the study, found 34.7% of the placebo and 32.3% of the toremifene groups had cancer events. No distinction was found in Gleason scores of either group.

Previous murine studies using transgenic adenocarcinoma of mouse prostate (TRAMP) mice showed toremifene prevented palpable tumors in 60% of the animals. This study used toremifene as an early prophylactic, which differentiates it from the phase III human studies.
