= Anthramine =

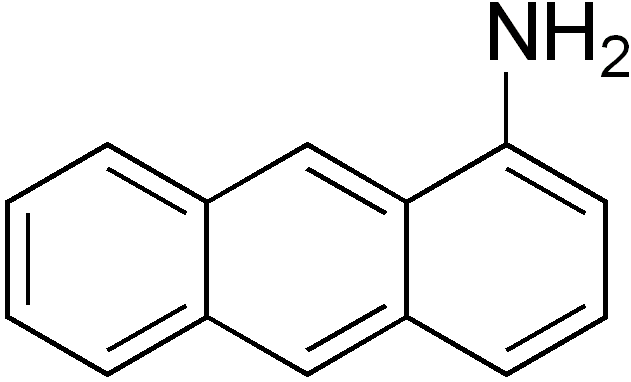
- Skeletal formula

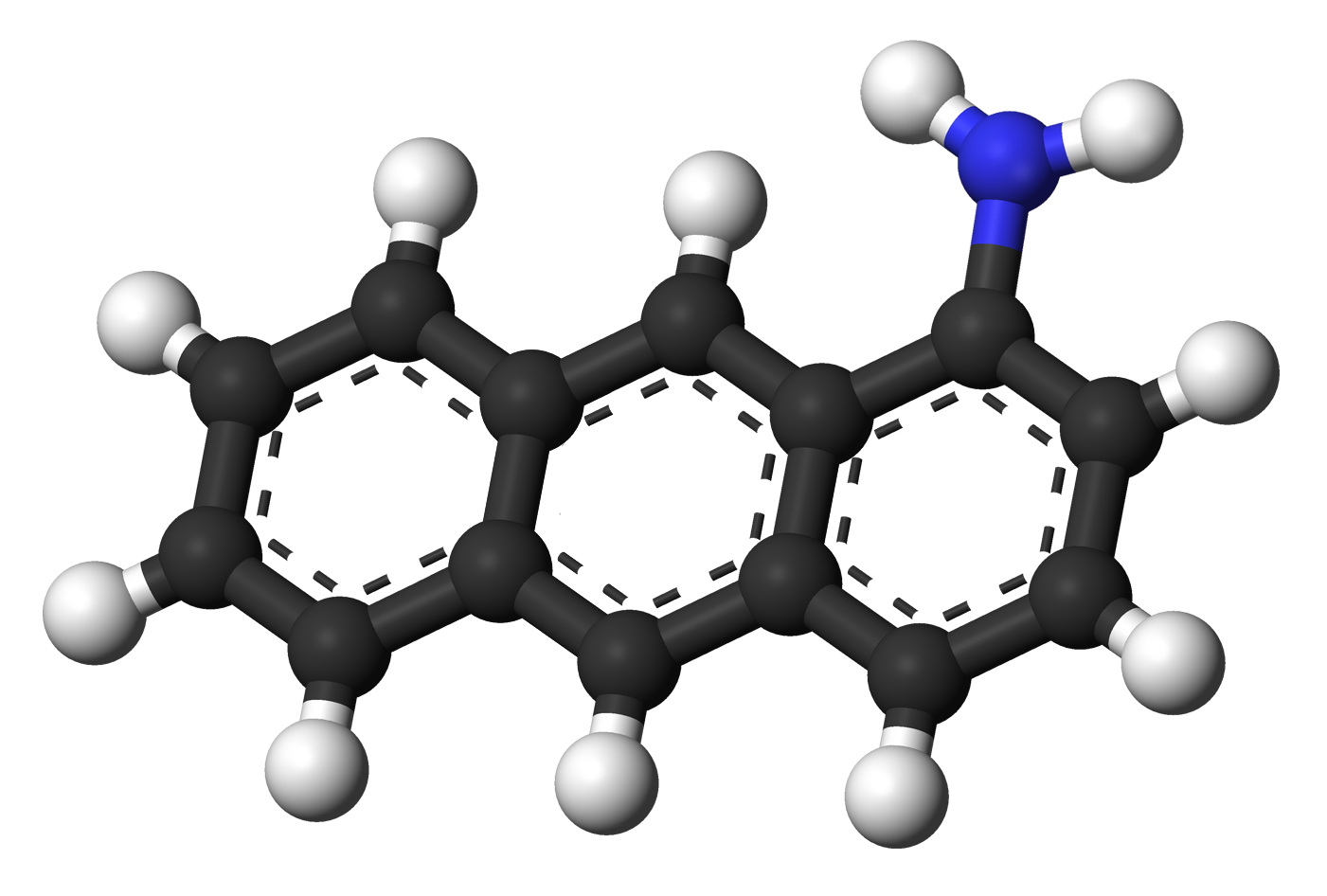
- Ball-and-stick model

Names
- Preferred IUPAC name Anthracen-1-amine
- Other names 1-Aminoanthracene; 1-Anthracenamine

Identifiers
CAS Number	610-49-1
3D model (JSmol)	Interactive image
Beilstein Reference	2209406
ChEBI	CHEBI:40678
ChEMBL	ChEMBL82321
ChemSpider	11392
DrugBank	DB01976
ECHA InfoCard	100.009.297
EC Number	210-225-8
Gmelin Reference	676719
PubChem CID	11885
UNII	8H6056DWN2
CompTox Dashboard (EPA)	DTXSID00209859
- InChI: InChI=1S/C14H11N/c15-14-7-3-6-12-8-10-4-1-2-5-11(10)9-13(12)14/h1-9H,15H2 Key: YUENFNPLGJCNRB-UHFFFAOYSA-N; InChI=1/C14H11N/c15-14-7-3-6-12-8-10-4-1-2-5-11(10)9-13(12)14/h1-9H,15H2 Key: YUENFNPLGJCNRB-UHFFFAOYAW
- SMILES: c3cc2cc1cccc(N)c1cc2cc3

Properties
Chemical formula	C_{14}H_{11}N
Density	1.208 g/cm^{3}

Hazards
- GHS labelling
Pictograms	(GHS07: Exclamation mark)
Signal word	Warning
Hazard statements	H315, H319, H335
Precautionary statements	P261, P264, P271, P280, P302+P352, P304+P340, P305+P351+P338, P312, P321, P332+P313, P337+P313, P362, P403+P233, P405, P501
Flash point	224.4 °C (435.9 °F; 497.5 K)
- Except where otherwise noted, data are given for materials in their standard state (at 25 °C [77 °F], 100 kPa). verify (what is ?) Infobox references

Anthramine (1-aminoanthracene) (an organic compound with the chemical formula C_{14}H_{11}N.) is a fluorescent general anesthetic.
