= Study of Tamoxifen and Raloxifene =

Clinical trial on breast cancer

The Study of Tamoxifen and Raloxifene (STAR) is a clinical trial from the early 2000s designed determine how the drug raloxifene compares with the drug tamoxifen in reducing the incidence of breast cancer in women who are at increased risk of the disease.

== Research ==
One of the largest breast cancer prevention studies ever, it included 22,000 women in 400 medical centers in the United States and Canada.

The study concluded that raloxifene caused fewer side-effects and less endometrial cancer than tamoxifen. Raloxifene was found to be more effective at preventing noninvasive breast cancer but less effective at preventing invasive breast cancer.
