= D-15414 =

Chemical compound

Identifiers
- IUPAC name: 1-ethyl-2-(4-hydroxyphenyl)-3-methylindol-5-ol
- CAS Number: 86111-11-7
- PubChem CID: 128800
- ChemSpider: 114137
- UNII: 58AE9Z8TW6
- ChEMBL: ChEMBL287232
- CompTox Dashboard (EPA): DTXSID801006609

Chemical and physical data
- Formula: C_{17}H_{17}NO_{2}
- Molar mass: 267.328 g·mol^{−1}
- 3D model (JSmol): Interactive image
- SMILES: CCN1C2=C(C=C(C=C2)O)C(=C1C3=CC=C(C=C3)O)C
- InChI: InChI=1S/C17H17NO2/c1-3-18-16-9-8-14(20)10-15(16)11(2)17(18)12-4-6-13(19)7-5-12/h4-10,19-20H,3H2,1-2H3; Key:BXTNOIWYTWIPEL-UHFFFAOYSA-N

D-15414 is a nonsteroidal weak estrogen of the 2-phenylindole group which was never marketed. It is the major metabolite of the selective estrogen receptor modulator (SERM) zindoxifene (D-16726). D-15414 has high affinity for the estrogen receptor (ER) and inhibits the growth of ER-positive MCF-7 breast cancer cells in vitro. However, contradictorily, subsequent research found that the drug produced fully estrogenic effects in vitro similarly to but less actively than estradiol, with no antiestrogenic activity observed. The reason for the discrepancy between the findings is unclear, though may be due to methodology. The unexpected estrogenic activity of D-15414 may be responsible for the failure of zindoxifene in clinical trials as a treatment for breast cancer.
