= Zindoxifene =

Chemical compound

Clinical data
- Other names: D-16726; NSC-341952

Identifiers
- IUPAC name: [4-(5-Acetyloxy-1-ethyl-3-methylindol-2-yl)phenyl] acetate
- CAS Number: 86111-26-4
- PubChem CID: 65645
- ChemSpider: 59082
- UNII: 1IRS95M8DN
- KEGG: C14745
- ChEBI: CHEBI:35052
- ChEMBL: ChEMBL32227
- CompTox Dashboard (EPA): DTXSID60235396

Chemical and physical data
- Formula: C_{21}H_{21}NO_{4}
- Molar mass: 351.402 g·mol^{−1}
- 3D model (JSmol): Interactive image
- SMILES: CCN1C2=C(C=C(C=C2)OC(=O)C)C(=C1C3=CC=C(C=C3)OC(=O)C)C
- InChI: InChI=1S/C21H21NO4/c1-5-22-20-11-10-18(26-15(4)24)12-19(20)13(2)21(22)16-6-8-17(9-7-16)25-14(3)23/h6-12H,5H2,1-4H3; Key:KSZGVNZSUJHOJA-UHFFFAOYSA-N

Zindoxifene (INN; former developmental code names D-16726, NSC-341952) is a nonsteroidal selective estrogen receptor modulator (SERM) that was under development in the 1980s and early 1990s for the treatment of breast cancer but was not marketed. It showed estrogenic-like activity in preclinical studies and failed to demonstrate effectiveness as a treatment for breast cancer in clinical trials. Zindoxifene was the lead compound of the distinct 2-phenylindole class of SERMs, and the marketed SERM bazedoxifene was derived from the major active metabolite of zindoxifene, D-15414. Zindoxifene was first described in 1984.
