= Etazepine =

Chemical compound

Clinical data
- ATC code: None

Identifiers
- IUPAC name: 11-ethoxy-5-methyl-5,11-dihydro-6H-dibenzo[b,e]azepin-6-one
- CAS Number: 88124-27-0
- PubChem CID: 65662
- ChemSpider: 59097
- UNII: SBC76K7XWC
- ChEMBL: ChEMBL2106559
- CompTox Dashboard (EPA): DTXSID10868996
- ECHA InfoCard: 100.081.231

Chemical and physical data
- Formula: C_{17}H_{17}NO_{2}
- Molar mass: 267.328 g·mol^{−1}
- 3D model (JSmol): Interactive image
- SMILES: O=C3c1c(cccc1)C(OCC)c2c(cccc2)N3C
- InChI: InChI=1S/C17H17NO2/c1-3-20-16-12-8-4-5-9-13(12)17(19)18(2)15-11-7-6-10-14(15)16/h4-11,16H,3H2,1-2H3; Key:BLGFGFHRMMDRPC-UHFFFAOYSA-N

Etazepine (INN) is an anticonvulsant with a tricyclic structure which is related to the benzodiazepines, but was never marketed. It appears to exert its effects via acting through the GABAergic system.

== See also ==
- Benzodiazepine
