= 2-Phenylindole =

Names
- Preferred IUPAC name 2-Phenyl-1H-indole

Identifiers
CAS Number	948-65-2
3D model (JSmol)	Interactive image
ChemSpider	13105
ECHA InfoCard	100.012.215
PubChem CID	13698
UNII	MQD44HV3P1
CompTox Dashboard (EPA)	DTXSID8061343
- InChI: InChI=1S/C14H11N/c1-2-6-11(7-3-1)14-10-12-8-4-5-9-13(12)15-14/h1-10,15H Key: KLLLJCACIRKBDT-UHFFFAOYSA-N; InChI=1/C14H11N/c1-2-6-11(7-3-1)14-10-12-8-4-5-9-13(12)15-14/h1-10,15H Key: KLLLJCACIRKBDT-UHFFFAOYAH
- SMILES: c1ccc(cc1)c2cc3ccccc3[nH]2

Properties
Chemical formula	C_{14}H_{11}N
Molar mass	193.249 g·mol^{−1}
- Except where otherwise noted, data are given for materials in their standard state (at 25 °C [77 °F], 100 kPa). Infobox references

2-Phenylindole is an organic compound. It is the parent structure of a group of nonsteroidal selective estrogen receptor modulators (SERMs) that includes zindoxifene, bazedoxifene, and pipendoxifene, as well as the nonsteroidal estrogen D-15414 (the major metabolite of zindoxifene).
