= C23H32O3 =

The molecular formula C_{23}H_{32}O_{3} may refer to:

- 16-Dehydropregnenolone acetate
- Estradiol 3-tetrahydropyranyl ether
- Estradiol 17β-tetrahydropyranyl ether
- Estradiol pivalate
- Estradiol valerate
- Progesterone 3-acetyl enol ether
- Quinestradol
- THC-O-acetate
