= List of estrogen esters =

Estradiol, the base estrogen of most estrogen esters.

This is a list of estrogen esters, or ester prodrugs of estrogens. It includes esters, as well as ethers, of steroidal estrogens like estradiol, estrone, and estriol and of nonsteroidal estrogens like the stilbestrols diethylstilbestrol and hexestrol.

== Esters of steroidal estrogens ==
=== Estradiol esters ===
==== Marketed ====
Many esters of estradiol have been marketed, including the following major esters:

- Estradiol acetate (Femring, Femtrace, Menoring)
- Estradiol benzoate (Agofollin Depot, Progynon-B; Duogynon, Primosiston, Sistocyclin)
- Estradiol cypionate (Depo-Estradiol, Depofemin, Estradep; Cyclofem, Lunelle)
- Estradiol dipropionate (Agofollin, Di-Ovocyclin, Progynon-DP; EP Hormone Depot)
- Estradiol enanthate (Perlutal, Topasel, Unalmes, Yectames)
- Estradiol undecylate (Delestrec, Progynon Depot)
- Estradiol valerate (Delestrogen, Progynon Depot, Progynova; Gravibinon, Mesigyna, Mesygest; Neofollin)
- Polyestradiol phosphate (Estradurin) (an estradiol ester in polymeric form)

And the following less commonly used esters:

- Cloxestradiol acetate (Genovul; diacetate ester of cloxestradiol, or estradiol 17β-chloral hemiacetal ether)
- Estradiol benzoate butyrate (Redimen, Soluna, Unijab, Unimens)
- Estradiol butyrylacetate (Follikoside)
- Estradiol dibutyrate (Triormon Depositum)
- Estradiol dienantate (Climacteron, Lactimex, Lactostat)
- Estradiol diundecylate (Estrolent; Trioestrine Retard)
- Estradiol diundecylenate (Etrosteron)
- Estradiol furoate (Di-Folliculine)
- Estradiol hemisuccinate (Eutocol; Hosterona)
- Estradiol hemihydrate (Estrofem)
- Estradiol hexahydrobenzoate (Benzo-Ginoestril A.P., BenzoGynoestryl Retard, Ginestryl-15-Depot, Menodin, Tardoginestryl)
- Estradiol palmitate (Esmopal)
- Estradiol phenylpropionate (Dimenformon Prolongatum; Estandron Prolongatum, Lynandron Prolongatum, Mixogen)
- Estradiol pivalate (Estrotate; Estrotate with Progesterone)
- Estradiol propionate (estradiol 17β-propionate) (Acrofollin, Akrofollin, Follhormon)
- Estradiol propoxyphenylpropionate (Durovex)
- Estradiol stearate (Depofollan)
- Estradiol sulfate (a minor constituent of conjugated estrogens (Premarin))

The following nitrogen mustard ester of estradiol is a cytostatic antineoplastic agent and has been marketed:

- Estramustine phosphate (Emcyt, Estracyt; estradiol 3-normustine 17β-phosphate)

==== Never marketed ====
A number of other estradiol esters which have not been marketed include:

- Estradiol 3-furoate
- Estradiol 3-propionate (not to be confused with estradiol monopropionate (estradiol 17β-propionate))
- Estradiol 17β-(1-(4-(aminosulfonyl)benzoyl)-L-proline) (EC508)
- Estradiol acetate benzoate
- Estradiol 17β-acetate
- Estradiol 17β-benzoate
- Estradiol acetylsalicylate (estradiol 3-acetylsalicylate)
- Estradiol anthranilate (estradiol 3-anthranilate)
- Estradiol arachidonate
- Estradiol benzoate cyclooctenyl ether (estradiol 3-benzoate 17β-cyclooctenyl ether; EBCO)
- Estradiol caprylate (estradiol octanoate)
- Estradiol cyclooctyl acetate (E2CoA)
- Estradiol decanoate (estradiol 17β-decanoate)
- Estradiol diacetate
- Estradiol dibenzoate
- Estradiol dicypionate
- Estradiol dioleate
- Estradiol dipalmitate
- Estradiol distearate
- Estradiol disulfate
- Estradiol glucuronide
- Estradiol sulfate glucuronide
- Estradiol linoleate
- Estradiol oleate
- Estradiol phosphate
- Estradiol salicylate (estradiol 3-salicylate)
- Estradiol sulfamate (E2MATE; J995, PGL-2, PGL-2001, ZK-190628; estradiol-3-O-sulfamate)
- Estradiol undecylenate (SH-368)
- Estrapronicate (estradiol 3-propionate 17β-nicotinate; Trophobolene, Trophoboline)
- Orestrate (estradiol 3-propionate 17β-(1-cyclohexenyl) ether)

The following cytostatic antineoplastic nitrogen mustard esters of estradiol have not been marketed:

- Alestramustine (estradiol 3-(bis(2-chloroethyl)carbamate), 17-ester with L-alanine)
- Atrimustine (KM-2210; bestrabucil, busramustine)
- Estradiol mustard (NSC-112259; chlorphenacyl estradiol diester)
- Estramustine (Leo 275; Ro 21-8837)
- Estromustine (Leo 271 f; estrone 17β-3-N-bis(2-chloroethyl)carbamate, estrone–cytostatic complex)

=== Estrone esters ===
==== Marketed ====
Esters of estrone that have been marketed include:

- Estrone acetate (Hovigal)
- Estrone sulfate (as the primary component of conjugated estrogens (Premarin))
  - Estropipate (Ogen, Ortho-Est) (a salt of estrone sulfate and piperazine)
- Estrone tetraacetylglucoside (Glucovex, Glycovex)

==== Never marketed ====
Other estrone esters which are notable but have not been marketed include:

- Estrone benzoate
- Estrone cyanate
- Estrone enanthate
- Estrone enanthate benzilic acid hydrazone
- Estrone glucuronide
- Estrone phosphate
- Estrone propionate
- Estrone sulfamate (EMATE; J994; estrone-3-O-sulfamate)
- Estrone oleate

=== Estriol esters ===
==== Marketed ====
Esters of estriol that have been marketed include:

- Estriol 3-glucuronide (as a component of conjugated estriol (Emmenin, Progynon))
- Estriol acetate benzoate (Holin-Depot)
- Estriol glucuronide (as a component of conjugated estriol (Emmenin, Progynon))
- Estriol succinate (Sinapause, Styptanon, Synapause)
  - Estriol sodium succinate (Pausan, Styptanon)
- Estriol sulfate (as a component of conjugated estriol (Emmenin, Progynon))
- Estriol sulfate glucuronide (as a component of conjugated estriol (Emmenin, Progynon))
- Estriol tripropionate (Estriel)
- Polyestriol phosphate (Gynäsan, Klimadurin, Triodurin) (an estriol ester in polymeric form)

==== Never marketed ====
The following ester of estriol was never marketed:

- Estriol dihexanoate
- Estriol dipropionate
- Estriol phosphate (E3P)
- Estriol sulfamate (E3MATE; J1034; estriol-3-O-sulfamate)
- Estriol triacetate

=== Ethinylestradiol esters ===
==== Marketed ====
The following esters of ethinylestradiol exist and have been marketed:

- Ethinylestradiol sulfonate (Turisteron; ethinylestradiol 3-isopropylsulfonate)

==== Never marketed ====
- Ethinylestradiol benzoate – the 3-benzoate ester of ethinylestradiol
- Ethinylestradiol N,N-diethylsulfamate (J271) – the 3-(N,N-diethyl)sulfamate ester of ethinylestradiol
- Ethinylestradiol pyrrolidinosulfonate (J272) – the 3-pyrrolidinosulfonate ester of ethinylestradiol
- Ethinylestradiol sulfamate (J1028) – the 3-sulfamate ester of ethinylestradiol
- Ethinylestradiol sulfate

=== Esters of other steroidal estrogens ===
==== Marketed ====
The following esters of other estrogens exist and have been marketed:

- Hydroxyestrone diacetate (Colpoginon, Colpormon, Hormobion, Hormocervix) – the 3,16α-diacetate ester of 16α-hydroxyestrone

== Ethers of steroidal estrogens ==
=== Marketed ===
A number of estrogen ethers also exist and have been marketed, including:

- Clomestrone (Arterolo, Atheran, Colesterel, Iposclerone, Liprotene, Persclerol) – the 3-methyl ether of 16α-chloroestrone
- Cloxestradiol acetate (Genovul) – the O,O-diacetate ester of cloxestradiol (estradiol 17β-chloral hemiacetal ether)
- Mestranol (Devocin, Ovastol, Tranel) (component of Enovid, Enavid, Ortho-Novin, Femigen, Norbiogest) – the 3-methyl ether of ethinylestradiol
- Moxestrol (Surestryl) – the 11β-methoxy derivative of ethinylestradiol (and hence the 11β-methyl ether of the 11β-hydroxyl derivative of ethinylestradiol)
- Nilestriol (Wei Ni An) – the 3-cyclopentyl ether of ethinylestriol
- Promestriene (Colpotrofin, Colpotrophine, Delipoderm) – the 3-propyl and 17β-methyl diether of estradiol
- Quinestradol (Colpovis, Colpovister, Pentovis) – the 3-cyclopentyl ether of estriol
- Quinestrol (Agalacto-Quilea, Basaquines, Eston, Estrovis, Estrovister, Plestrovis, Qui-lea) – the 3-cyclopentyl ether of ethinylestradiol

=== Never marketed ===
A few other estrogen ethers which are notable but have not been marketed include:

- Cloxestradiol – the 17β-chloral hemiacetal ether of estradiol
- Estradiol benzoate cyclooctenyl ether – the 17β-cyclooctenyl ether of estradiol 3-benzoate
- Estradiol 3-saccharinylmethyl ether – the 3-(saccharinylmethyl) ether of estradiol
- Estradiol 3-tetrahydropyranyl ether – the 3-(tetrahydropyran-2-yl) ether of estradiol
- Estradiol 17β-tetrahydropyranyl ether – the 17β-(tetrahydropyran-2-yl) ether of estradiol
- Estrone methyl ether – the 3-methyl ether of estrone
- Mytatrienediol – the 3-methyl ether of 16α-methyl-16β-epiestriol
- Orestrate – the 17β-(1-cyclohexenyl) ether of estradiol 3-propionate

== Esters of nonsteroidal estrogens ==
=== Diethylstilbestrol esters ===
==== Marketed ====
Major esters of diethylstilbestrol include:

- Diethylstilbestrol dipropionate (Agostilben, Biokeral, Clinestrol, Cyclen, Estilbin, Estril, Neobenzoestrol, Orestol, Oroestrol, Ostregenin, Prostilbene, Stilbestriol DP, Stilboestrolum Dipropionicum, Stilboestrol, Synestrin, Willestrol)
- Fosfestrol (diethylstilbestrol diphosphate) (Honvan, Difostilben, Fosfostilben, Fostrolin, Stilbol, Stilphostrol, Vagestrol)

Less commonly used esters of diethylstilbestrol include:

- Diethylstilbestrol diacetate (Hormostilboral Stark)
- Diethylstilbestrol dilaurate (Acnestrol-Lotion)
- Diethylstilbestrol dipalmitate (stilpalmitate) (Palmestril, Stilpalmitate)
- Diethylstilbestrol disulfate (Hydroestryl, Idroestril)

==== Never marketed ====
- Diethylstilbestrol sulfate
- Furostilbestrol (diethylstilbestrol difuroate)
- Polydiethylstilbestrol phosphate

As well as the following nitrogen mustard ester:

- ICI-85966 (Stilbostat; diethylstilbestrol bis(di(2-chloroethyl)carbamate))

=== Hexestrol esters ===
==== Marketed ====
- Hexestrol diacetate (Retalon Lingual, Robal, Sintestrol, Sintofolin)
- Hexestrol dicaprylate (dioctanoylhexestrol) (Taston)
- Hexestrol diphosphate (Cytostesin, Pharmestrin, Retalon Aquosum)
- Hexestrol dipropionate (Hexanoestrol, Retalon Oleosum)
- Hexestrol phosphate (Retalon Aquosum)

==== Never marketed ====
The following nitrogen mustard ester of hexestrol was never marketed:

- Phenestrol (fenestrol; hexestrol bis[4-[bis(2-chloroethyl)amino]phenylacetate)

=== Esters of other nonsteroidal estrogens ===
==== Marketed ====
- Dienestrol diacetate (Faragynol, Gynocyrol)
- Methestrol dipropionate (promethestrol dipropionate, dimethylhexestrol dipropionate) (Meprane Dipropionate)

== Ethers of nonsteroidal estrogens ==
=== Diethylstilbestrol ===
==== Marketed ====
- Diethylstilbestrol monobenzyl ether (benzelstilbestrol) (Monozol, Hypantin, Pituitrope)
- Dimestrol (dianisylhexene, diethylstilbestrol dimethyl ether, dimethoxydiethylstilbestrol) (Depot-Ostromon, Synthila)
- Mestilbol (diethylstilbestrol monomethyl ether) (Monomestro or Monomestrol)

== See also ==
- List of estrogens
- List of progestogen esters
- List of androgen esters
- List of combined sex-hormonal preparations
