= Estradiol 3-propionate =

Chemical compound

Clinical data
- Other names: Estradiol 3-propanoate; 3-Propanoylestradiol; 3,17β-Hydroxyestra-1,3,5(10)-trien-3-yl propionate
- Routes of administration: Intramuscular injection, vaginal
- Drug class: Estrogen; Estrogen ester
- ATC code: None

Identifiers
- IUPAC name: [(8R,9S,13S,14S,17S)-17-Hydroxy-13-methyl-6,7,8,9,11,12,14,15,16,17-decahydrocyclopenta[a]phenanthren-3-yl] propanoate
- CAS Number: 1323-33-7
- ChemSpider: 2298529
- UNII: DS9WS297BV
- CompTox Dashboard (EPA): DTXSID60927623

Chemical and physical data
- Formula: C_{21}H_{28}O_{3}
- Molar mass: 328.452 g·mol^{−1}
- 3D model (JSmol): Interactive image
- SMILES: CCC(=O)Oc1ccc2c(c1)CC[C@@H]3[C@@H]2CC[C@]4([C@H]3CC[C@@H]4O)C
- InChI: InChI=1S/C21H28O3/c1-3-20(23)24-14-5-7-15-13(12-14)4-6-17-16(15)10-11-21(2)18(17)8-9-19(21)22/h5,7,12,16-19,22H,3-4,6,8-11H2,1-2H3/t16-,17-,18+,19?,21?/m1/s1; Key:InChIKey=FONFXFZWMZJFCD-NYKHLBABSA-N

Estradiol 3-propionate, or 3-propanoylestradiol, also known as estra-1,3,5(10)-triene-3,17β-diol 3-propionate, is a semisynthetic, steroidal estrogen that was never marketed. It is an estrogen ester, specifically, a propionic acid ester of estradiol, and acts as a prodrug to it in vivo. The chemical structure of estradiol 3-propionate is contained within estradiol dipropionate, estrapronicate, and orestrate, all of which are also estradiol esters.

== See also ==
- List of estrogen esters § Estradiol esters
