= Estradiol tetrahydropyranyl ether =

Estradiol tetrahydropyranyl ether may refer to:

- Estradiol 3-tetrahydropyranyl ether
- Estradiol 17β-tetrahydropyranyl ether
