= Estradiol propionate =

Estradiol propionate (or estradiol propanoate) may refer to:

- Estradiol 17β-propionate
- Estradiol 3-propionate
- Estradiol 3,17β-dipropionate
