= Estriol sulfamate =

Chemical compound

Clinical data
- Other names: Estriol 3-O-sulfamate; J1034; E3MATE; Estra-1,3,5(10)-triene-3,16α,17β-triol 3-sulfamate; 16α,17β-Dihydroxyestra-1,3,5(10)-trien-3-yl sulfamate
- Routes of administration: By mouth
- Drug class: Estrogen; Estrogen ester

Identifiers
- IUPAC name: [(8R,9S,13S,14S,16R,17R)-16,17-Dihydroxy-13-methyl-6,7,8,9,11,12,14,15,16,17-decahydrocyclopenta[a]phenanthren-3-yl] sulfamate
- CAS Number: 175219-34-8
- PubChem CID: 9864027
- ChemSpider: 8039721
- UNII: 8VUN4GN4UP

Chemical and physical data
- Formula: C_{18}H_{25}NO_{5}S
- Molar mass: 367.46 g·mol^{−1}
- 3D model (JSmol): Interactive image
- SMILES: C[C@]12CC[C@H]3[C@H]([C@@H]1C[C@H]([C@@H]2O)O)CCC4=C3C=CC(=C4)OS(=O)(=O)N
- InChI: InChI=1S/C18H25NO5S/c1-18-7-6-13-12-5-3-11(24-25(19,22)23)8-10(12)2-4-14(13)15(18)9-16(20)17(18)21/h3,5,8,13-17,20-21H,2,4,6-7,9H2,1H3,(H2,19,22,23)/t13-,14-,15+,16-,17+,18+/m1/s1; Key:VGHIBOFCBWMZNZ-ZXXIGWHRSA-N

Estriol sulfamate (developmental code name J1034), or estriol 3-O-sulfamate, is a synthetic estrogen and estrogen ester which was never marketed. It is the C3 sulfamate ester of estriol. The drug shows substantially improved oral estrogenic potency (vagina, uterus) relative to estriol in rats but without an increase in hepatic estrogenic potency. However, the closely related compound estradiol sulfamate (E2MATE) failed to show estrogenic activity in humans, which is due to the fact that it is additionally a highly potent inhibitor of steroid sulfatase which regulates the estrogenicity of such compounds and thus it prevents its own bioactivation into estradiol.

== See also ==
- List of estrogen esters § Estriol esters
