= Estradiol cyclooctyl acetate =

Chemical compound

Clinical data
- Other names: E_{2}COA; Estradiol cyclooctylacetate; Estradiol 17β-cyclooctylacetate; Estra-1,3,5(10)-triene-3,17β-diol 17β-cyclooctylacetate
- Routes of administration: By mouth
- Drug class: Estrogen; Estrogen ester

Identifiers
- IUPAC name: [(8R,9S,13S,14S,17S)-3-Hydroxy-13-methyl-6,7,8,9,11,12,14,15,16,17-decahydrocyclopenta[a]phenanthren-17-yl] 2-cyclooctylacetate
- CAS Number: 66791-46-6
- PubChem CID: 67083
- ChemSpider: 60433
- CompTox Dashboard (EPA): DTXSID10985354

Chemical and physical data
- Formula: C_{28}H_{40}O_{3}
- Molar mass: 424.625 g·mol^{−1}
- 3D model (JSmol): Interactive image
- SMILES: C[C@]12CC[C@H]3[C@H]([C@@H]1CC[C@@H]2OC(=O)CC4CCCCCCC4)CCC5=C3C=CC(=C5)O
- InChI: InChI=1S/C28H40O3/c1-28-16-15-23-22-12-10-21(29)18-20(22)9-11-24(23)25(28)13-14-26(28)31-27(30)17-19-7-5-3-2-4-6-8-19/h10,12,18-19,23-26,29H,2-9,11,13-17H2,1H3/t23-,24-,25+,26+,28+/m1/s1; Key:CZCGBAHDFURTGU-VMBLQBCYSA-N

Estradiol cyclooctyl acetate (E_{2}COA), or estradiol 17β-cyclooctylacetate, also known as estra-1,3,5(10)-triene-3,17β-diol 17β-cyclooctylacetate, is an estrogen medication and an estrogen ester – specifically, the 17β-cyclooctylacetate ester of estradiol – which has been studied for use in hormone replacement therapy for ovariectomized women and as a hormonal contraceptive in combination with a progestin but was never marketed. It has greater oral bioavailability than does micronized estradiol due to absorption via the lymphatic system and hence partial bypassing of first-pass metabolism. It is approximately twice as potent as micronized estradiol orally and has a comparatively reduced impact on liver parameters such as changes in sex hormone-binding globulin production. It was investigated in combination with desogestrel as a birth control pill, but resulted in unacceptable menstrual bleeding patterns and was not further developed.

== See also ==
- List of estrogen esters § Estradiol esters
