= Estradiol 3-saccharinylmethyl ether =

Chemical compound

Clinical data
- Other names: E2SME; 3-O-(Saccharinylmethyl)-17β-estradiol; 3-O-(Saccharinylmethyl)estra-1,3,5(10)-triene-3,17β-diol
- Routes of administration: By mouth
- Drug class: Estrogen

Identifiers
- IUPAC name: 2-[[(8R,9S,13S,14S,17S)-17-hydroxy-13-methyl-6,7,8,9,11,12,14,15,16,17-decahydrocyclopenta[a]phenanthren-3-yl]oxymethyl]-1,1-dioxo-1,2-benzothiazol-3-one
- CAS Number: 157231-19-1
- PubChem CID: 177989
- ChemSpider: 154944
- UNII: AEF2Q624EL
- CompTox Dashboard (EPA): DTXSID40935645

Chemical and physical data
- Formula: C_{26}H_{29}NO_{5}S
- Molar mass: 467.58 g·mol^{−1}
- 3D model (JSmol): Interactive image
- SMILES: C[C@]12CC[C@H]3[C@H]([C@@H]1CC[C@@H]2O)CCC4=C3C=CC(=C4)OCN5C(=O)C6=CC=CC=C6S5(=O)=O
- InChI: InChI=1S/C26H29NO5S/c1-26-13-12-19-18-9-7-17(14-16(18)6-8-20(19)22(26)10-11-24(26)28)32-15-27-25(29)21-4-2-3-5-23(21)33(27,30)31/h2-5,7,9,14,19-20,22,24,28H,6,8,10-13,15H2,1H3/t19-,20-,22+,24+,26+/m1/s1; Key:QNUCLUWOICXPIY-QETBJLDASA-N

Estradiol 3-saccharinylmethyl ether (E2SME), also known as 3-O-(saccharinylmethyl)-17β-estradiol, is a synthetic estrogen and estrogen ether – specifically, the C3 saccharinylmethyl ether of estradiol – which was described in the mid-1990s and was never marketed. It is a prodrug of estradiol and appears to be partially protected from first-pass metabolism in the liver and intestines with oral administration, showing greatly improved oral potency compared to estradiol.

E2SME has been found to be 9-fold as potent as estradiol by the oral route in rats. Similarly, its bioavailability (16%) was 5-fold greater than that of estradiol via the oral route in rats, and the elimination half-life of released estradiol was 5- to 7-fold longer than that of regular estradiol. Conversely, when E2SME and estradiol were given intravenously in rats, there was no difference between them in terms of potency. In vitro studies revealed that E2SME is not hydrolyzed to estradiol enzymatically but rather is hydrolyzed chemically in biological media such as plasma, apparently dependent on the concentration of protein.

== See also ==
- List of estrogen esters § Ethers of steroidal estrogens
