= Cloxestradiol =

Chemical compound

Clinical data
- Other names: 17-(2,2,2-Trichloroethoxy)estradiol; 17-(1-Hydroxy-2,2,2-trichloroethoxy)estra-1,3,5(10-trien-3-ol
- Drug class: Estrogen; Estrogen ether

Identifiers
- IUPAC name: (8R,9S,13S,14S,17S)-13-methyl-17-(2,2,2-trichloro-1-hydroxyethoxy)-6,7,8,9,11,12,14,15,16,17-decahydrocyclopenta[a]phenanthren-3-ol
- CAS Number: 54063-33-1
- PubChem CID: 194705
- ChemSpider: 168924
- UNII: 42R9MZG1DL
- CompTox Dashboard (EPA): DTXSID701045814

Chemical and physical data
- Formula: C_{20}H_{25}Cl_{3}O_{3}
- Molar mass: 419.77 g·mol^{−1}
- 3D model (JSmol): Interactive image
- SMILES: C[C@]12CC[C@@H]3c4ccc(cc4CC[C@H]3[C@@H]1CC[C@@H]2OC(C(Cl)(Cl)Cl)O)O
- InChI: InChI=1S/C20H25Cl3O3/c1-19-9-8-14-13-5-3-12(24)10-11(13)2-4-15(14)16(19)6-7-17(19)26-18(25)20(21,22)23/h3,5,10,14-18,24-25H,2,4,6-9H2,1H3/t14-,15-,16+,17+,18?,19+/m1/s1; Key:JVLHMVXGPLKLFV-AJUWMHLFSA-N

Cloxestradiol (INN), also known as 17-(2,2,2-trichloroethoxy)estradiol, is a synthetic, steroidal estrogen which was never marketed. It is an analogue of estradiol with a 2,2,2-trichloroethoxy substitution. The O,O-diacetate derivative, cloxestradiol acetate (brand name Genovul), has been marketed as an estrogen.

== See also ==
- List of estrogens
- List of estrogen esters
