= Estrone phosphate =

Chemical compound

Clinical data
- Other names: Estrone 3-phosphate; E1P; O3-Phosphonoestrone; 17-Oxoestra-1,3,5(10)-trien-3-yl dihydrogen phosphate
- Drug class: Estrogen; Steroid sulfatase inhibitor

Identifiers
- IUPAC name: [(8R,9S,13S,14S)-13-methyl-17-oxo-7,8,9,11,12,14,15,16-octahydro-6H-cyclopenta[a]phenanthren-3-yl] dihydrogen phosphate
- CAS Number: 1240-03-5
- PubChem CID: 445419
- ChemSpider: 393068
- UNII: 52ZYE9C9X9
- ChEMBL: ChEMBL1232577
- CompTox Dashboard (EPA): DTXSID60924677

Chemical and physical data
- Formula: C_{18}H_{23}O_{5}P
- Molar mass: 350.351 g·mol^{−1}
- 3D model (JSmol): Interactive image
- SMILES: C[C@]12CC[C@H]3[C@H]([C@@H]1CCC2=O)CCC4=C3C=CC(=C4)OP(=O)(O)O
- InChI: InChI=1S/C18H23O5P/c1-18-9-8-14-13-5-3-12(23-24(20,21)22)10-11(13)2-4-15(14)16(18)6-7-17(18)19/h3,5,10,14-16H,2,4,6-9H2,1H3,(H2,20,21,22)/t14-,15-,16+,18+/m1/s1; Key:XYNRXDLLYXFCRS-CBZIJGRNSA-N

Estrone phosphate (E1P), or estrone 3-phosphate, is an estrogen and steroid sulfatase inhibitor which was never marketed. It has similar affinity for steroid sulfatase as estrone sulfate and acts as a competitive inhibitor of the enzyme. In contrast to estrone sulfate however, it is not hydrolyzed by steroid sulfatase and is instead metabolized by phosphatases.

== See also ==
- List of estrogen esters § Estrone esters
- Estradiol phosphate
- Estriol phosphate
