= Ethinylestradiol benzoate =

Chemical compound

Clinical data
- Other names: 17α-Ethynylestradiol 3-benzoate
- Drug class: Estrogen; Estrogen ester

Identifiers
- IUPAC name: [(8R,9S,13S,14S,17R)-17-ethynyl-17-hydroxy-13-methyl-7,8,9,11,12,14,15,16-octahydro-6H-cyclopenta[a]phenanthren-3-yl] benzoate
- CAS Number: 5934-04-3
- PubChem CID: 13591267
- CompTox Dashboard (EPA): DTXSID801336361

Chemical and physical data
- Formula: C_{27}H_{28}O_{3}
- Molar mass: 400.518 g·mol^{−1}
- 3D model (JSmol): Interactive image
- SMILES: C[C@]12CC[C@H]3[C@H]([C@@H]1CC[C@]2(C#C)O)CCC4=C3C=CC(=C4)OC(=O)C5=CC=CC=C5
- InChI: InChI=1S/C27H28O3/c1-3-27(29)16-14-24-23-11-9-19-17-20(30-25(28)18-7-5-4-6-8-18)10-12-21(19)22(23)13-15-26(24,27)2/h1,4-8,10,12,17,22-24,29H,9,11,13-16H2,2H3/t22-,23-,24+,26+,27+/m1/s1; Key:PQPDFKSTDGKONX-IUJPGNIVSA-N

Ethinylestradiol benzoate, or 17α-ethynylestradiol 3-benzoate, is a synthetic estrogen and estrogen ester – specifically, the C3 benzoate ester of ethinylestradiol – which was first described in the late 1930s and was never marketed.

== See also ==
- List of estrogen esters § Esters of other steroidal estrogens
