= Estradiol dibenzoate =

Synthetic estrogen

Clinical data
- Other names: EDB; Estradiol 3,17β-dibenzoate; Estra-1,3,5(10)-triene-3,17β-diol 3,17β-dibenzoate

Identifiers
- IUPAC name: [(8R,9S,13S,14S,17S)-3-benzoyloxy-13-methyl-6,7,8,9,11,12,14,15,16,17-decahydrocyclopenta[a]phenanthren-17-yl] benzoate
- CAS Number: 4147-13-1
- PubChem CID: 22796092
- ChemSpider: 18511171
- UNII: 65W00I5071
- CompTox Dashboard (EPA): DTXSID70194364

Chemical and physical data
- Formula: C_{32}H_{32}O_{4}
- Molar mass: 480.604 g·mol^{−1}
- 3D model (JSmol): Interactive image
- SMILES: C[C@]12CC[C@H]3[C@H]([C@@H]1CC[C@@H]2OC(=O)C4=CC=CC=C4)CCC5=C3C=CC(=C5)OC(=O)C6=CC=CC=C6
- InChI: InChI=1S/C32H32O4/c1-32-19-18-26-25-15-13-24(35-30(33)21-8-4-2-5-9-21)20-23(25)12-14-27(26)28(32)16-17-29(32)36-31(34)22-10-6-3-7-11-22/h2-11,13,15,20,26-29H,12,14,16-19H2,1H3/t26-,27-,28+,29+,32+/m1/s1; Key:QSEBTTYLHXQXSF-CAHAWPIUSA-N

Estradiol dibenzoate (EDB), also known as estradiol 3,17β-dibenzoate, is an estrogen ester which was developed in the 1930s and was never marketed. It is the C3 and C17β benzoate diester of estradiol. Estradiol dibenzoate has a longer duration of action than estradiol benzoate (estradiol 3-benzoate) by depot injection.

== See also ==
- List of estrogen esters § Estradiol esters
