= Ethinylestradiol sulfamate =

Chemical compound

Clinical data
- Other names: 17α-Ethynylestradiol 3-O-sulfamate; J1028; EEMATE; EE2MATE; 17α-Ethynylestra-1,3,5(10)-triene-3,17β-diol 3-sulfamate
- Routes of administration: By mouth
- Drug class: Estrogen; Estrogen ester

Identifiers
- IUPAC name: [(8R,9S,13S,14S,17R)-17-Ethynyl-17-hydroxy-13-methyl-7,8,9,11,12,14,15,16-octahydro-6H-cyclopenta[a]phenanthren-3-yl] sulfamate
- CAS Number: 91490-65-2
- PubChem CID: 9799774
- ChemSpider: 7975539
- UNII: 8MM253B4X2

Chemical and physical data
- Formula: C_{20}H_{25}NO_{4}S
- Molar mass: 375.48 g·mol^{−1}
- 3D model (JSmol): Interactive image
- SMILES: C[C@]12CC[C@H]3[C@H]([C@@H]1CC[C@]2(C#C)O)CCC4=C3C=CC(=C4)OS(=O)(=O)N
- InChI: InChI=1S/C20H25NO4S/c1-3-20(22)11-9-18-17-6-4-13-12-14(25-26(21,23)24)5-7-15(13)16(17)8-10-19(18,20)2/h1,5,7,12,16-18,22H,4,6,8-11H2,2H3,(H2,21,23,24)/t16-,17-,18+,19+,20+/m1/s1; Key:FIILGZCJKYBWGS-SLHNCBLASA-N

Ethinylestradiol sulfamate (developmental code name J1028), or 17α-ethynylestradiol 3-O-sulfamate, is a synthetic estrogen and estrogen ester which was never marketed. It is the C3 sulfamate ester of ethinylestradiol. The drug shows considerably improved oral estrogenic potency (uterotrophic) relative to ethinylestradiol in rats but without an increase in hepatic estrogenic potency. Related compounds like ethinylestradiol N,N-diethylsulfamate (J271) and ethinylestradiol pyrrolidinosulfonate (J272) have also been developed, and have similar properties in animals. However, the closely related compound estradiol sulfamate (E2MATE) failed to show estrogenic activity in humans, which is because it is additionally a highly potent inhibitor of steroid sulfatase and prevents its own bioactivation into estradiol.

== See also ==
- List of estrogen esters § Esters of other steroidal estrogens
