= C27H36O3 =

The molecular formula C_{27}H_{36}O_{3} may refer to:

- Orestrate
- Quingestanol acetate
