= C23H26O4 =

The molecular formula C_{23}H_{26}O_{4} (molar mass: 366.45 g/mol, exact mass: 366.1831 u) may refer to:

- Estradiol furoate, an estrogen medication and estrogen ester
- PSB-SB-1202, a coumarin derivative
