= Cloxestradiol acetate =

Chemical compound

Clinical data
- Trade names: Genovul
- Other names: 17-(2,2,2-Trichloroethoxy)estradiol O,O-diacetate; 1-{[(17β)-3-Acetoxyestra-1,3,5(10)-trien-17-yl]oxy}-2,2,2-trichloroethyl acetate
- Pregnancy category: X (Contraindicated)
- Drug class: Estrogen; Estrogen ester; Estrogen ether

Identifiers
- IUPAC name: [(8R,9S,13S,14S,17S)-17-(1-Acetyloxy-2,2,2-trichloroethoxy)-13-methyl-6,7,8,9,11,12,14,15,16,17-decahydrocyclopenta[a]phenanthren-3-yl] acetate
- CAS Number: 15686-44-9
- PubChem CID: 71586995
- ChemSpider: 34989697
- UNII: CWU34U962K
- CompTox Dashboard (EPA): DTXSID50166145

Chemical and physical data
- Formula: C_{24}H_{29}Cl_{3}O_{5}
- Molar mass: 503.84 g·mol^{−1}
- 3D model (JSmol): Interactive image
- SMILES: CC(=O)OC1=CC2=C(C=C1)C3CCC4(C(C3CC2)CCC4OC(C(Cl)(Cl)Cl)OC(=O)C)C
- InChI: InChI=1S/C24H29Cl3O5/c1-13(28)30-16-5-7-17-15(12-16)4-6-19-18(17)10-11-23(3)20(19)8-9-21(23)32-22(24(25,26)27)31-14(2)29/h5,7,12,18-22H,4,6,8-11H2,1-3H3/t18-,19-,20+,21+,22?,23+/m1/s1; Key:UEVLJPRROXDIPO-CUFSGNDSSA-N

Cloxestradiol acetate (brand name Genovul), also known as 17-(2,2,2-trichloroethoxy)estradiol O,O-diacetate, is a synthetic steroidal estrogen derived from estradiol. It is the O,O-diacetate ester of cloxestradiol, which, in contrast to cloxestradiol acetate, was never marketed.

== See also ==
- List of estrogen esters § Estradiol esters
- Cloxotestosterone acetate
