= Estradiol anthranilate =

Chemical compound

Clinical data
- Other names: Estradiol 3-anthranilate
- Routes of administration: By mouth
- Drug class: Estrogen; Estrogen ester

Identifiers
- IUPAC name: [(8R,9S,13S,14S,17S)-17-hydroxy-13-methyl-6,7,8,9,11,12,14,15,16,17-decahydrocyclopenta[a]phenanthren-3-yl] 2-aminobenzoate
- CAS Number: 111111-97-8
- PubChem CID: 183167
- ChemSpider: 159275
- UNII: O6PNX53TGK
- CompTox Dashboard (EPA): DTXSID70912000

Chemical and physical data
- Formula: C_{25}H_{29}NO_{3}
- Molar mass: 391.511 g·mol^{−1}
- 3D model (JSmol): Interactive image
- SMILES: C[C@]12CC[C@H]3[C@H]([C@@H]1CC[C@@H]2O)CCC4=C3C=CC(=C4)OC(=O)C5=CC=CC=C5N
- InChI: InChI=1S/C25H29NO3/c1-25-13-12-18-17-9-7-16(29-24(28)20-4-2-3-5-22(20)26)14-15(17)6-8-19(18)21(25)10-11-23(25)27/h2-5,7,9,14,18-19,21,23,27H,6,8,10-13,26H2,1H3/t18-,19-,21+,23+,25+/m1/s1; Key:KZDLYRDWDPOBMR-CWWQDXLCSA-N

Estradiol anthranilate, or estradiol 3-anthranilate, is a synthetic estrogen and estrogen ester – specifically, the C3 anthranilic acid ester of estradiol – which was described in the late 1980s and was never marketed. In dogs, the oral bioavailability of estradiol anthranilate was found to be 5-fold higher than that of unmodified estradiol. However, a subsequent study found that the oral bioavailability of estradiol and estradiol anthranilate did not differ considerably in rats (4.3% and 3.2%, respectively), suggestive of a major species difference.

== See also ==
- List of estrogen esters § Estradiol esters
