= Estradiol dicypionate =

Chemical compound

Clinical data
- Other names: EDC; Estradiol 3,17β-dicypionate; Estradiol dicipionate; Estradiol dicyclopentylpropionate; Estradiol dicyclopentanepropionate; Estra-1,3,5(10)-triene-3,17β-diol 3,17β-di(cyclopentanepropionate)

Identifiers
- IUPAC name: [(8R,9S,13S,14S,17S)-3-(3-cyclopentylpropanoyloxy)-13-methyl-6,7,8,9,11,12,14,15,16,17-decahydrocyclopenta[a]phenanthren-17-yl] 3-cyclopentylpropanoate
- CAS Number: 633-36-3
- PubChem CID: 101811
- ChemSpider: 91987
- UNII: EV7SH765LS
- CompTox Dashboard (EPA): DTXSID80979386

Chemical and physical data
- Formula: C_{34}H_{48}O_{4}
- Molar mass: 520.754 g·mol^{−1}
- 3D model (JSmol): Interactive image
- SMILES: C[C@]12CC[C@H]3[C@H]([C@@H]1CC[C@@H]2OC(=O)CCC4CCCC4)CCC5=C3C=CC(=C5)OC(=O)CCC6CCCC6
- InChI: InChI=1S/C34H48O4/c1-34-21-20-28-27-15-13-26(37-32(35)18-10-23-6-2-3-7-23)22-25(27)12-14-29(28)30(34)16-17-31(34)38-33(36)19-11-24-8-4-5-9-24/h13,15,22-24,28-31H,2-12,14,16-21H2,1H3/t28-,29-,30+,31+,34+/m1/s1; Key:PVDLDDBZCWVZBX-FTWOUWFXSA-N

Estradiol dicypionate (EDC), also known as estradiol 3,17β-dicypionate, is an estrogen ester which was never marketed. It is the C3 and C17β cypionate (cyclopentylpropionate) diester of estradiol.

== See also ==
- List of estrogen esters § Estradiol esters
