= EBCO =

EBCO may refer to:

- Estradiol benzoate cyclooctenyl ether, a synthetic estrogen
- European Bureau for Conscientious Objection, an international peace organisation
- Ebco Industries, a manufacturing company
