= Estradiol furoate =

Chemical compound

Clinical data
- Trade names: Di-Folliculine
- Other names: EF; 17-Furoylestradiol; 17-(2-Furancarbonyl)estradiol
- Routes of administration: Intramuscular injection
- Drug class: Estrogen; Estrogen ester

Identifiers
- IUPAC name: [(8R,9S,13S,14S,17S)-3-hydroxy-13-methyl-6,7,8,9,11,12,14,15,16,17-decahydrocyclopenta[a]phenanthren-17-yl] furan-2-carboxylate
- CAS Number: 1083178-02-2
- PubChem CID: 25111789
- ChemSpider: 58838618
- UNII: WZW1I7J5RW
- CompTox Dashboard (EPA): DTXSID001046411

Chemical and physical data
- Formula: C_{23}H_{26}O_{4}
- Molar mass: 366.457 g·mol^{−1}
- 3D model (JSmol): Interactive image
- SMILES: C[C@]12CC[C@H]3[C@@H](CCc4cc(O)ccc34)[C@@H]1CC[C@@H]2OC(=O)c5occc5
- InChI: InChI=1S/C23H26O4/c1-23-11-10-17-16-7-5-15(24)13-14(16)4-6-18(17)19(23)8-9-21(23)27-22(25)20-3-2-12-26-20/h2-3,5,7,12-13,17-19,21,24H,4,6,8-11H2,1H3/t17-,18-,19+,21+,23+/m1/s1; Key:UZMCMLLMBRERNY-BEARUUAKSA-N

Estradiol furoate (EF), or estradiol 17β-furoate, sold under the brand name Di-Folliculine, is an estrogen medication and estrogen ester which is no longer marketed. It is the C17β furoate ester of estradiol. Estradiol benzoate has also been marketed under the brand name Di-Folliculine, and should not be confused with estradiol furoate.

The duration of action of the related estradiol ester estradiol 3-furoate by intramuscular injection was studied in women in 1952. Its duration in oil solution was found to be similar to that of estradiol benzoate in oil solution and shorter than that of estradiol dipropionate in oil solution.

== See also ==
- List of estrogen esters § Estradiol esters
