= Estrone benzoate =

Chemical compound

Clinical data
- Other names: Ketohydroxyestrin benzoate; Estra-1,3,5(10)-trien-3-ol-17-one 3-benzoate
- Routes of administration: Intramuscular injection
- Drug class: Estrogen; Estrogen ester

Identifiers
- IUPAC name: [(8R,9S,13S,14S)-13-methyl-17-oxo-7,8,9,11,12,14,15,16-octahydro-6H-cyclopenta[a]phenanthren-3-yl] benzoate
- CAS Number: 2393-53-5
- PubChem CID: 15818351
- ChemSpider: 18553608
- UNII: O636LYL5W8
- ChEMBL: ChEMBL1628207
- CompTox Dashboard (EPA): DTXSID00946752

Chemical and physical data
- Formula: C_{25}H_{26}O_{3}
- Molar mass: 374.480 g·mol^{−1}
- 3D model (JSmol): Interactive image
- SMILES: C[C@]12CC[C@H]3[C@H]([C@@H]1CCC2=O)CCC4=C3C=CC(=C4)OC(=O)C5=CC=CC=C5
- InChI: InChI=1S/C25H26O3/c1-25-14-13-20-19-10-8-18(28-24(27)16-5-3-2-4-6-16)15-17(19)7-9-21(20)22(25)11-12-23(25)26/h2-6,8,10,15,20-22H,7,9,11-14H2,1H3/t20-,21-,22+,25+/m1/s1; Key:HKUKRSLIEVXDMS-APDHKMKFSA-N

Estrone benzoate, or estrone 3-benzoate, is a synthetic estrogen and estrogen ester – specifically, the C3 benzoate ester of estrone – which was first reported in 1932 and was never marketed. It led to the development in 1933 of the more active estradiol benzoate, the first estradiol ester to be introduced for medical use.

== See also ==
- List of estrogen esters § Estrone esters
