= Estradiol propoxyphenylpropionate =

Chemical compound

Clinical data
- Trade names: Durovex
- Other names: EPPP; Estradiol 17-(4-propoxyphenyl)propanoate; Estradiol p-propoxyhydrocinnamate
- Routes of administration: Intramuscular injection
- Drug class: Estrogen; Estrogen ester

Identifiers
- IUPAC name: [(8R,9S,13S,14S,17S)-3-Hydroxy-13-methyl-6,7,8,9,11,12,14,15,16,17-decahydrocyclopenta[a]phenanthren-17-yl] 3-(4-propoxyphenyl)propanoate
- CAS Number: 7724-88-1
- PubChem CID: 90479312
- ChemSpider: 34995669
- UNII: 288OER048N
- CompTox Dashboard (EPA): DTXSID101046414

Chemical and physical data
- Formula: C_{30}H_{38}O_{4}
- Molar mass: 462.630 g·mol^{−1}
- 3D model (JSmol): Interactive image
- SMILES: CCCOc1ccc(CCC(=O)O[C@H]2CC[C@H]3[C@@H]4CCc5cc(O)ccc5[C@H]4CC[C@]23C)cc1
- InChI: InChI=1S/C30H38O4/c1-3-18-33-23-9-4-20(5-10-23)6-15-29(32)34-28-14-13-27-26-11-7-21-19-22(31)8-12-24(21)25(26)16-17-30(27,28)2/h4-5,8-10,12,19,25-28,31H,3,6-7,11,13-18H2,1-2H3/t25-,26-,27+,28+,30+/m1/s1; Key:JNWIUSBBFNMZRQ-BOJCFLQHSA-N

Estradiol propoxyphenylpropionate (EPPP), sold under the brand name Durovex, is an estrogen medication and estrogen ester which is no longer marketed. It is the C17β propoxyphenylpropionate (propoxyhydrocinnamate) ester of estradiol. It is a long-acting depot estrogen.

== See also ==
- List of estrogen esters § Estradiol esters
