= Estradiol acetylsalicylate =

Chemical compound

Clinical data
- Other names: Estradiol 3-acetylsalicylate; Acetylsalicylate estradiol
- Routes of administration: By mouth
- Drug class: Estrogen; Estrogen ester

Identifiers
- IUPAC name: [(8R,9S,13S,14S,17S)-17-hydroxy-13-methyl-6,7,8,9,11,12,14,15,16,17-decahydrocyclopenta[a]phenanthren-3-yl] 2-acetyloxybenzoate
- CAS Number: 111111-98-9
- PubChem CID: 183168
- ChemSpider: 159276
- UNII: J9B90ASJ1Y
- CompTox Dashboard (EPA): DTXSID30912001

Chemical and physical data
- Formula: C_{27}H_{30}O_{5}
- Molar mass: 434.532 g·mol^{−1}
- 3D model (JSmol): Interactive image
- SMILES: CC(=O)OC1=CC=CC=C1C(=O)OC2=CC3=C(C=C2)[C@H]4CC[C@]5([C@H]([C@@H]4CC3)CC[C@@H]5O)C
- InChI: InChI=1S/C27H30O5/c1-16(28)31-24-6-4-3-5-22(24)26(30)32-18-8-10-19-17(15-18)7-9-21-20(19)13-14-27(2)23(21)11-12-25(27)29/h3-6,8,10,15,20-21,23,25,29H,7,9,11-14H2,1-2H3/t20-,21-,23+,25+,27+/m1/s1; Key:KNJUTXJFANOVGR-HXVSAZQXSA-N

Estradiol acetylsalicylate, or estradiol 3-acetylsalicylate, is a synthetic estrogen and estrogen ester – specifically, the C3 acetylsalicylic acid (aspirin) ester of estradiol – which was described in the late 1980s and was never marketed. In dogs, the oral bioavailability of estradiol acetylsalicylate was found to be 17-fold higher than that of unmodified estradiol. However, a subsequent study found that the oral bioavailability of estradiol and estradiol acetylsalicylate did not differ significantly in rats (4.3% and 4.2%, respectively), suggestive of a major species difference.

== See also ==
- List of estrogen esters § Estradiol esters
