= Estradiol benzoate cyclooctenyl ether =

Chemical compound

EBCO

Clinical data
- Other names: EBCO; Estradiol 3-benzoate 17β-cyclooctenyl ether
- Routes of administration: By mouth
- Drug class: Estrogen; Estrogen ester; Estrogen ether

Identifiers
- IUPAC name: [(8R,9S,13S,14S,17S)-17-[(1E)-cycloocten-1-yl]oxy-13-methyl-6,7,8,9,11,12,14,15,16,17-decahydrocyclopenta[a]phenanthren-3-yl] benzoate
- CAS Number: 28200-94-4
- PubChem CID: 6436089
- ChemSpider: 4940765

Chemical and physical data
- Formula: C_{33}H_{40}O_{3}
- Molar mass: 484.680 g·mol^{−1}
- 3D model (JSmol): Interactive image
- SMILES: C[C@]12CC[C@H]3[C@H]([C@@H]1CC[C@@H]2O/C/4=C/CCCCCC4)CCC5=C3C=CC(=C5)OC(=O)C6=CC=CC=C6
- InChI: InChI=1S/C33H40O3/c1-33-21-20-28-27-17-15-26(36-32(34)23-10-6-5-7-11-23)22-24(27)14-16-29(28)30(33)18-19-31(33)35-25-12-8-3-2-4-9-13-25/h5-7,10-12,15,17,22,28-31H,2-4,8-9,13-14,16,18-21H2,1H3/b25-12+/t28-,29-,30+,31+,33+/m1/s1; Key:DOFNLZKUGHVIMH-UQWKGHMASA-N

Estradiol benzoate cyclooctenyl ether (EBCO), or estradiol 3-benzoate 17β-cyclooctenyl ether, is a synthetic estrogen as well as estrogen ester and ether – specifically, the C3 benzoate ester and C17β cyclooctenyl ether of estradiol – which was described in the early 1970s and was never marketed. It has been found to have a dramatically prolonged duration of action with oral administration in animals, similarly to the related compound quinestrol (the 3-cyclopentyl ether of ethinylestradiol). A single oral dose of EBCO sustained high uterus weights for 3 weeks in rats. This long-lasting activity may be due to storage of EBCO in fat. It appears that EBCO is absorbed satisfactorily from the gastrointestinal tract, at least partially survives first-pass metabolism in the liver and intestines, and is then sequestered into fat, from which it is slowly released and activated into estradiol. In contrast to quinestrol, the oral activity of EBCO is greatly improved when it is delivered in an oil solution as opposed to an aqueous vehicle.

== See also ==
- List of estrogen esters § Ethers of steroidal estrogens
