= Estradiol pivalate =

Chemical compound

Clinical data
- Trade names: Estrotate, Estrotate with Progesterone, Menotrope
- Other names: E2-TMA; Estradiol trimethyl acetate; Trimethyl estradiol acetate; Estradiol 17-(2,2-dimethylpropanoate)
- Routes of administration: By mouth, intramuscular injection
- Drug class: Estrogen; Estrogen ester

Identifiers
- IUPAC name: [(8R,9S,13S,14S,17S)-3-Hydroxy-13-methyl-6,7,8,9,11,12,14,15,16,17-decahydrocyclopenta[a]phenanthren-17-yl] 2,2-dimethylpropanoate
- CAS Number: 24894-50-6
- PubChem CID: 10522263
- ChemSpider: 8697659
- UNII: I12U06L6S4
- CompTox Dashboard (EPA): DTXSID40179603

Chemical and physical data
- Formula: C_{23}H_{32}O_{3}
- Molar mass: 356.506 g·mol^{−1}
- 3D model (JSmol): Interactive image
- SMILES: CC(C)(C)C(=O)O[C@H]1CC[C@H]2[C@@H]3CCc4cc(O)ccc4[C@H]3CC[C@]12C
- InChI: InChI=1S/C23H32O3/c1-22(2,3)21(25)26-20-10-9-19-18-7-5-14-13-15(24)6-8-16(14)17(18)11-12-23(19,20)4/h6,8,13,17-20,24H,5,7,9-12H2,1-4H3/t17-,18-,19+,20+,23+/m1/s1; Key:SLOFBKMZOOTTDZ-WCZGSDDISA-N

Estradiol pivalate, also known as estradiol trimethyl acetate (E2-TMA) and sold under the brand name Estrotate, is an estrogen medication and an estrogen ester; specifically, a pivalic acid (trimethylacetic acid) ester of estradiol. Literature sources are conflicting as to whether the ester is located at the C3 position or at the C17β position. It was marketed as an oil solution for intramuscular injection in the 1940s and 1950s. A combination of estradiol pivalate (1 mg/mL) and progesterone (10 mg/mL) in oil solution for intramuscular injection was available in 1949. An aqueous suspension of estradiol pivalate was also developed by 1950 although whether it was ever marketed is unclear.

The duration of biological effect of estradiol pivalate in women has been studied. It has been found to stimulate the vaginal epithelium in postmenopausal women, with a minimally effective dose of 0.16 mg and a maximally effective dose of 0.5 mg, both by intramuscular injection. Its effect lasted for about 4 weeks at a dose of 0.16 mg and for more than 7 weeks at a dose of 3.3 mg.

Menotrope was an oral tablet that contained 0.33 mg estradiol pivalate, 80 mg choline bitartrate, 0.46 mg folic acid, and 1.25 μg cyanocobalamin (vitamin B12) and was used in menopausal hormone therapy.

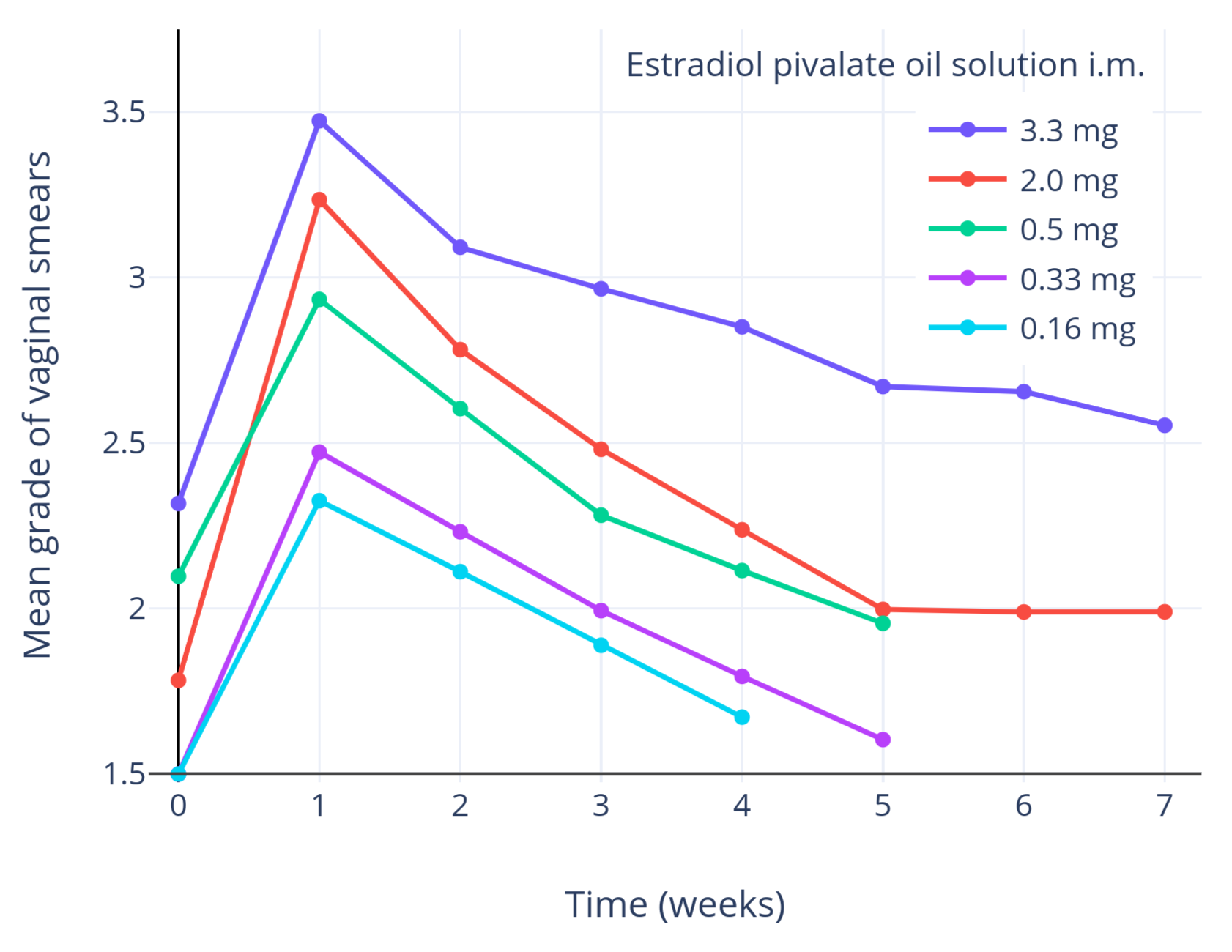
Mean change in vaginal smear test grade with different doses of estradiol pivalate (Estrotate) in oil solution by intramuscular injection in women. There were 10 to 20 women in each dose group.

== See also ==
- List of estrogen esters § Estradiol esters
