= Quinestradol =

Synthetic estrogen brand

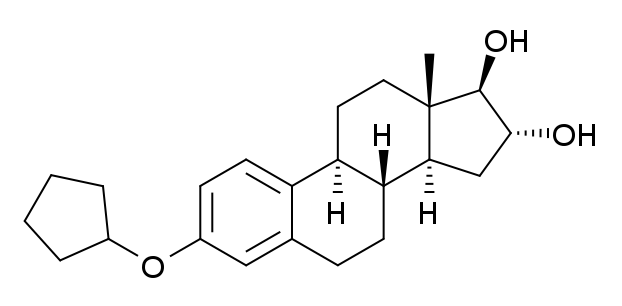

Clinical data
- Trade names: Colpovis, Colpovister, Pentovis
- Other names: Quinestradiol; Quinestriol; Estriol 3-cyclopentyl ether; E3CPE
- Routes of administration: By mouth
- Drug class: Estrogen; Estrogen ether
- ATC code: None

Identifiers
- IUPAC name: (8R,9S,13S,14S,16R,17R)-3-cyclopentyloxy-13-methyl-6,7,8,9,11,12,14,15,16,17-decahydrocyclopenta[a]phenanthrene-16,17-diol
- CAS Number: 1169-79-5
- PubChem CID: 14431
- ChemSpider: 16735993
- UNII: 422L8173W8
- CompTox Dashboard (EPA): DTXSID30878638
- ECHA InfoCard: 100.013.294

Chemical and physical data
- Formula: C_{23}H_{32}O_{3}
- Molar mass: 356.506 g·mol^{−1}
- 3D model (JSmol): Interactive image
- SMILES: CC12CCC3C(C1CC(C2O)O)CCC4=C3C=CC(=C4)OC5CCCC5
- InChI: InChI=1S/C23H32O3/c1-23-11-10-18-17-9-7-16(26-15-4-2-3-5-15)12-14(17)6-8-19(18)20(23)13-21(24)22(23)25/h7,9,12,15,18-22,24-25H,2-6,8,10-11,13H2,1H3/t18-,19-,20+,21-,22+,23+/m1/s1; Key:ODYKCPYPRCJXLY-PZORDLPLSA-N

Quinestradol (INN, BAN) (brand names Colpovis, Colpovister, Pentovis), also known as quinestradiol or quinestriol, as well as estriol 3-cyclopentyl ether (E3CPE), is a synthetic estrogen and estrogen ether which is no longer marketed. It is the 3-cyclopentyl ether of estriol. The medication has been studied in the treatment of stress incontinence in elderly women, with effectiveness observed.

== See also ==
- List of estrogens
- List of estrogen esters § Ethers of steroidal estrogens
