= Estrone tetraacetylglucoside =

Chemical compound

Identifiers
- IUPAC name: [(2R,3R,4S,5R,6S)-3,4,5-triacetyloxy-6-{[(8R,9S,13S,14S)-13-methyl-17-oxo-7,8,9,11,12,14,15,16-octahydro-6H-cyclopenta[a]phenanthren-3-yl]oxy}oxan-2-yl]methyl acetate
- CAS Number: 27610-08-8
- PubChem CID: 102146562
- ChemSpider: 26594301
- CompTox Dashboard (EPA): DTXSID901046420

Chemical and physical data
- Formula: C_{32}H_{40}O_{11}
- Molar mass: 600.661 g·mol^{−1}
- 3D model (JSmol): Interactive image
- SMILES: CC(=O)OCC1OC(Oc2ccc3C4CCC5(C)C(CCC5=O)C4CCc3c2)C(OC(C)=O)C(OC(C)=O)C1OC(C)=O
- InChI: InChI=1S/C32H40O11/c1-16(33)38-15-26-28(39-17(2)34)29(40-18(3)35)30(41-19(4)36)31(43-26)42-21-7-9-22-20(14-21)6-8-24-23(22)12-13-32(5)25(24)10-11-27(32)37/h7,9,14,23-26,28-31H,6,8,10-13,15H2,1-5H3; Key:IMZSXCARTLIDBP-UHFFFAOYSA-N

Estrone tetraacetylglucoside (brand name Glucovex, Glycovex) is a semisynthetic, steroidal estrogen. It is an estrogen ester, specifically, an ester of estrone. The drug was marketed since at least 1942.

Synthesis:
