= Orestrate =

Chemical compound

Clinical data
- Other names: Estradiol 3-propionate 17β-(1-cyclohexenyl) ether; 17β-(Cyclohexen-1-yloxy)-estra-1,3,5(10)-trien-3-ol propionate
- Drug class: Estrogen; Estrogen ester

Identifiers
- IUPAC name: [(8R,9S,13S,14S,17S)-17-(Cyclohexen-1-yloxy)-13-methyl-6,7,8,9,11,12,14,15,16,17-decahydrocyclopenta[a]phenanthren-3-yl] propanoate
- CAS Number: 13885-31-9
- PubChem CID: 20055348
- ChemSpider: 16736660
- UNII: G9VC23W7W0
- CompTox Dashboard (EPA): DTXSID80930230

Chemical and physical data
- Formula: C_{27}H_{36}O_{3}
- Molar mass: 408.582 g·mol^{−1}
- 3D model (JSmol): Interactive image
- SMILES: CCC(=O)OC1=CC2=C(C=C1)C3CCC4(C(C3CC2)CCC4OC5=CCCCC5)C
- InChI: InChI=1S/C27H36O3/c1-3-26(28)30-20-10-12-21-18(17-20)9-11-23-22(21)15-16-27(2)24(23)13-14-25(27)29-19-7-5-4-6-8-19/h7,10,12,17,22-25H,3-6,8-9,11,13-16H2,1-2H3/t22-,23-,24+,25+,27+/m1/s1; Key:VYAXJSIVAVEVHF-RYIFMDQWSA-N

Orestrate (INN), also known as estradiol 3-propionate 17β-(1-cyclohexenyl) ether, is an estrogen medication and estrogen ester which was never marketed. It is the C3 propionate ester and C17β-(1-cyclohexenyl) ether of estradiol.

== See also ==
- List of estrogen esters § Esters of steroidal estrogens
