= Estriol phosphate =

Chemical compound

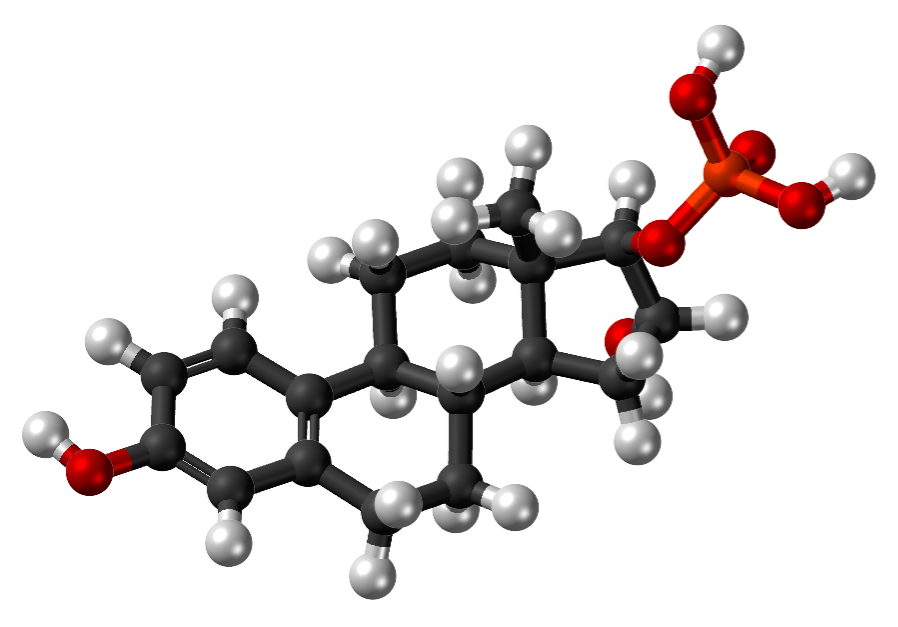

Clinical data
- Other names: E3P; Estriol 17β-phosphate; Estra-1,3,5(10)-triene-3,16α,17β-triol 17β-(dihydrogen phosphate); 3,16α-Diydroxyestra-1,3,5(10)-trien-17β-yl phosphate
- Drug class: Estrogen; Estrogen ester

Identifiers
- IUPAC name: (8R,9S,13S,14S,16R,17R)-3,16-Dihydroxy-13-methyl-7,8,9,11,12,13,14,15,16,17-decahydro-6H-cyclopenta[a]phenanthren-17-yl dihydrogen phosphate
- CAS Number: 35973-57-0
- PubChem CID: 139033615
- ChemSpider: 103881412
- UNII: FQ5FV85BS0
- CompTox Dashboard (EPA): DTXSID601142497

Chemical and physical data
- Formula: C_{18}H_{25}O_{6}P
- Molar mass: 368.366 g·mol^{−1}
- 3D model (JSmol): Interactive image
- SMILES: Oc1ccc2[C@H]3CC[C@]4(C)[C@]5([C@@]6C[C@H]4[C@@H]3CCc2c1).O6.O5P(O)(=O)O
- InChI: InChI=1S/C18H25O6P/c1-18-7-6-13-12-5-3-11(19)8-10(12)2-4-14(13)15(18)9-16(20)17(18)24-25(21,22)23/h3,5,8,13-17,19-20H,2,4,6-7,9H2,1H3,(H2,21,22,23)/t13-,14-,15+,16-,17+,18+/m1/s1; Key:HNKVQSMSAFUELQ-ZXXIGWHRSA-N

Estriol phosphate (E3P), or estriol 17β-phosphate, also known as estra-1,3,5(10)-triene-3,16α,17β-triol 17β-(dihydrogen phosphate), is an estrogen which was never marketed. It is an estrogen ester, specifically an ester of estriol with phosphoric acid, and acts as a prodrug of estriol by cleavage via phosphatase enzymes in the body. Estriol phosphate is contained within the chemical structure of polyestriol phosphate (a polymer of estriol phosphate), and this medication has been marketed for medical use (brand names Gynäsan, Klimadurin, Triodurin).

== See also ==
- List of estrogen esters § Estriol esters
