= Estradiol 3-tetrahydropyranyl ether =

Chemical compound

Clinical data
- Other names: NSC-86473; Estra-1,3,5(10)-triene-17β-diol 3-(tetrahydropyran-2-yl) ether; 3-(Tetrahydro-2H-pyran-2-yloxy)estra-1,3,5(10)-trien-3-ol
- Routes of administration: By mouth
- Drug class: Estrogen; Estrogen ether

Identifiers
- IUPAC name: (8R,9S,13S,14S,17S)-13-Methyl-3-(oxan-2-yloxy)-6,7,8,9,11,12,14,15,16,17-decahydrocyclopenta[a]phenanthren-17-ol
- CAS Number: 41781-86-6
- PubChem CID: 257864
- ChemSpider: 226239
- UNII: 2UC9XAN8CV
- ChEMBL: ChEMBL472508

Chemical and physical data
- Formula: C_{23}H_{32}O_{3}
- Molar mass: 356.506 g·mol^{−1}
- 3D model (JSmol): Interactive image
- SMILES: C[C@]12CC[C@H]3[C@H]([C@@H]1CC[C@@H]2O)CCC4=C3C=CC(=C4)OC5CCCCO5
- InChI: InChI=1S/C23H32O3/c1-23-12-11-18-17-8-6-16(26-22-4-2-3-13-25-22)14-15(17)5-7-19(18)20(23)9-10-21(23)24/h6,8,14,18-22,24H,2-5,7,9-13H2,1H3/t18-,19-,20+,21+,22?,23+/m1/s1; Key:BOLMNLJKDBCJIB-CUFSGNDSSA-N

Estradiol 3-tetrahydropyranyl ether is a synthetic estrogen and estrogen ether which was never marketed. It has been reported to possess improved oral activity relative to estradiol. One study in animals found that it had fifteen times the oral activity of estradiol.

== See also ==
- List of estrogen esters § Ethers of steroidal estrogens
