= Oleoyl-estrone =

Chemical compound

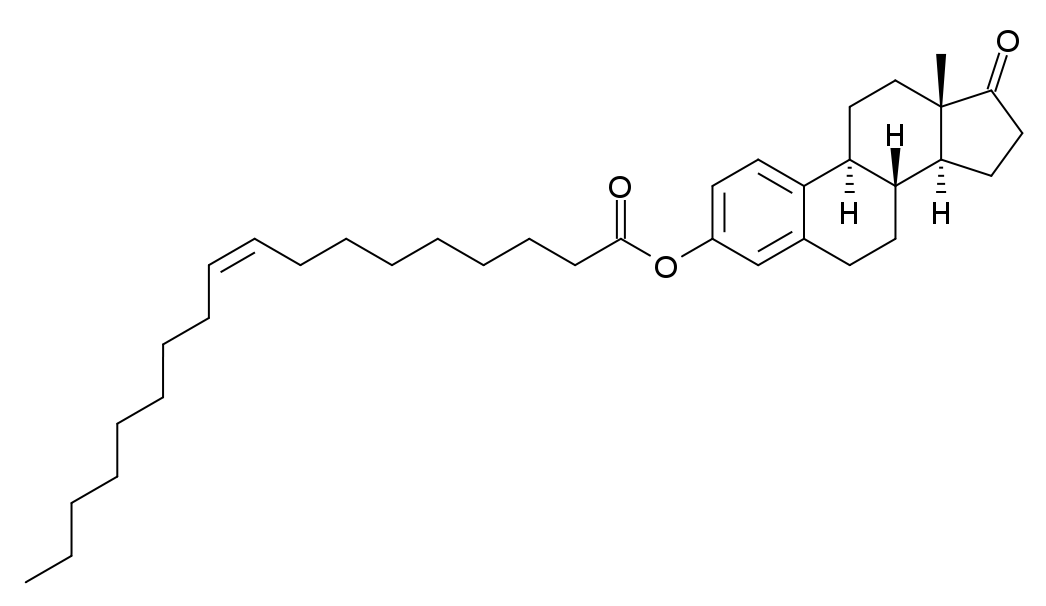

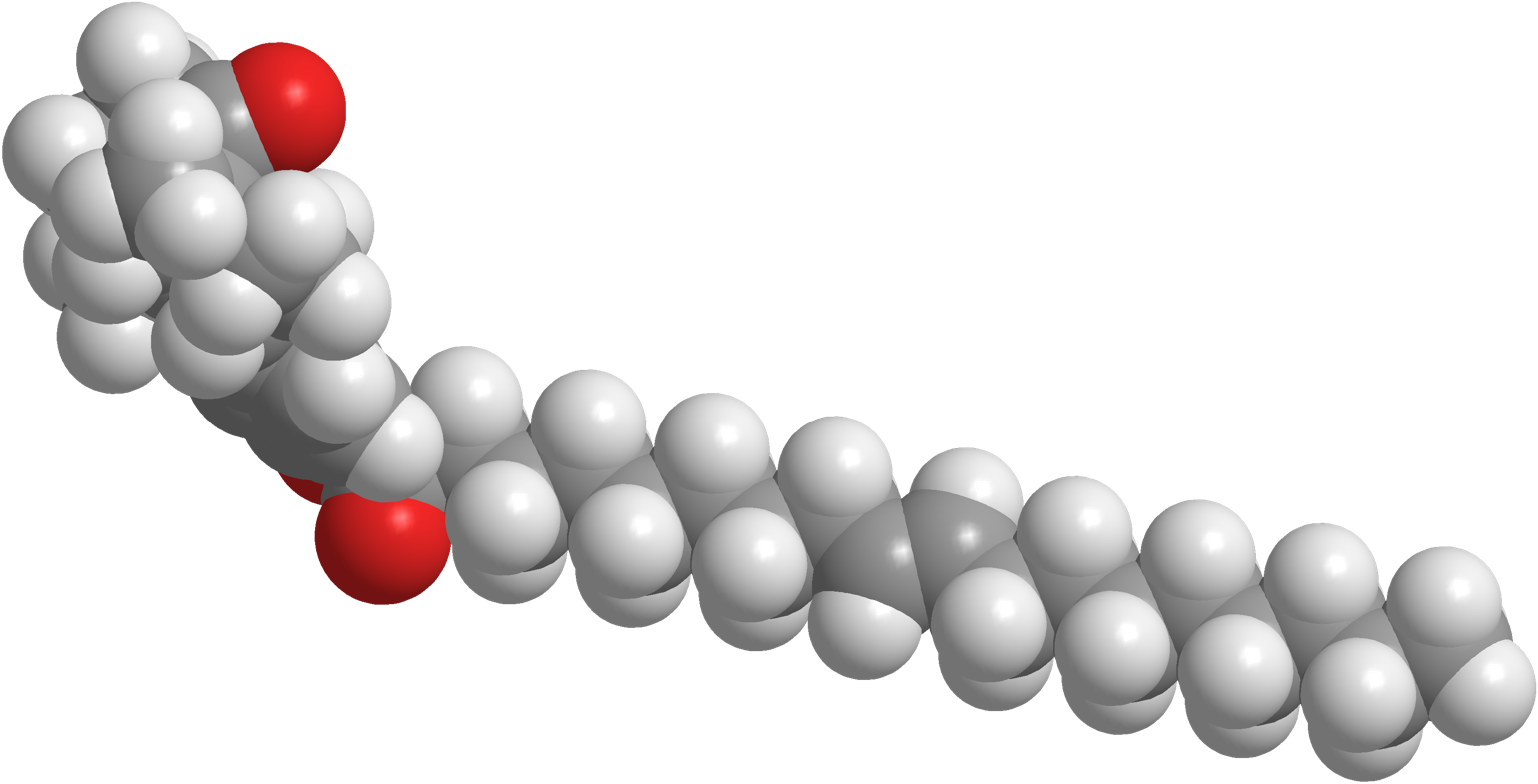

Clinical data
- Other names: Estrone 3-oleate; Estrone oleic acid; 17-Oxoestra-1,3,5(10)-trien-3-yl (9Z)-9-octadecenoate; Estra-1,3,5-trien-3-ol-17-one 3-((9Z)-octadec-9-enoate)
- Routes of administration: Oral

Identifiers
- IUPAC name: [(8R,9S,13S,14S)-13-Methyl-17-oxo-7,8,9,11,12,14,15,16-octahydro-6H-cyclopenta[a]phenanthren-3-yl] (Z)-octadec-9-enoate
- CAS Number: 180003-17-2
- PubChem CID: 6918373
- DrugBank: DB04870
- ChemSpider: 5293576
- UNII: 64R56KMG1Z
- CompTox Dashboard (EPA): DTXSID8041086

Chemical and physical data
- Formula: C_{36}H_{54}O_{3}
- Molar mass: 534.825 g·mol^{−1}
- 3D model (JSmol): Interactive image
- SMILES: CCCCCCCC\C=C/CCCCCCCC(=O)c3cc(O)cc4CC[C@@H]2[C@H](CC[C@]1(C)C(=O)CC[C@H]12)c34
- InChI: InChI=1S/C36H54O3/c1-3-4-5-6-7-8-9-10-11-12-13-14-15-16-17-18-33(38)31-26-28(37)25-27-19-20-29-30(35(27)31)23-24-36(2)32(29)21-22-34(36)39/h10-11,25-26,29-30,32,37H,3-9,12-24H2,1-2H3/b11-10-/t29-,30+,32+,36+/m1/s1; Key:JWLQYWPSIIMIFS-AAZNOHQBSA-N

Oleoyl-estrone (OE), or estrone 3-oleate, is a fatty acid ester of estrone. It is a naturally circulating hormone in animals, including humans. It was studied as a potential weight-loss drug, but failed to show benefit in clinical trials. It was first reported in 1996 to cause a body fat loss effect in rats in the International Journal of Obesity and Related Metabolic Disorders. The animal research has all been conducted by the Nitrogen-Obesity Research Group of the University of Barcelona.

The compound was found to potently induce body-fat loss while preserving protein stores in animals which is the ultimate goal of an anti-obesity agent as body protein loss is an undesired but inevitable (to some degree) side effect of fat loss via calorie restriction.

== Mechanism of action ==
Oleoyl-estrone functions by reducing energy-intake without prescribed dietary restriction (forced dietary restriction in addition to OE actually led to protein losses) while maintaining energy expenditure (which normally falls as part of the adaptations to calorie restriction). The partitioning effects of this hormone leads to adipose stores being the source of energy that makes up for the energy deficit rather than protein stores.

== Research ==
The molecule has been widely studied in various strains of animals and shown to be effective in virtually all studies. A surprising result that came out of the animal studies was that OE treated animals maintained their fat loss after treatment was stopped. Weight loss maintenance is one of the most difficult aspects of obesity treatment and so this effect is promising. This led to the postulation that oleoyl-estrone can reduce the body's bodyfat setpoint which would allow the body to maintain a reduced bodyfat without experiencing a hormonal milieu that aims to regain the lost bodyfat by reducing energy expenditure and increasing energy intake.

The research group discovered that oleoyl-estrone levels correlated with bodyfat stores except for obese organisms where there was less oleoyl-estrone circulating than would be predicted based on bodyfat levels. This led to the theory that administering oleoyl-estrone to bring plasma OE levels up to normal would signal to the body that there is an excess amount of bodyfat and therefore there would be a bodyfat loss.

Recent research shows that corticosterone inhibits the fat mobilizing effects of oleoyl-estrone in female rats that had their adrenal glands removed.

The research group set up a company called Oleoyl-Estrone Developments in 2001 which included as a founder Marià Alemany, one of the principal researches, who is also the holder of a 1998 U.S. patent (U.S. patent 5,798,348) for fatty acid esters of estrone, including OE, in relation to fat loss.

The group studied the effects of oral OE on Marià Alemany who was morbidly obese. It was shown for the first time to be effective at producing fat loss in a human and also a maintenance (and increase) of weight loss in two-month rest periods in between three-week dosing periods. This was achieved with no prescribed dietary restrictions.

== Clinical development ==
OE was licensed to Manhattan Pharmaceuticals in 2002. An Investigational New Drug application was accepted by the U.S. Food and Drug Administration (FDA) in 2005 and a Phase I trial was conducted in Switzerland. The results showed OE to be safe and to lead to weight loss after just 7 days of dosing, and this weight loss was maintained for three further weeks after treatment had stopped.

In June 2006, a Phase IIa trial of 100 patients began which included two 14-day dosing periods each followed by 28 days of no treatment which was designed to elucidate the best dosing methods and in particular the maintenance of weight loss that had been shown. This trial was originally a single-centre trial in Switzerland, but in November 2006 it was announced that the trial had been expanded to two additional clinical sites in the USA. An additional trial was commenced in October 2006 that is designed to investigate the efficacy of the drug in morbidly obese patients who had been designated as bariatric patient candidates. This trial which took place in the United States, recruited 24 patients and dosed OE for 30 days, without any break, followed by 30 days of evaluation after dosing completed.

On July 10, 2007, Manhattan Pharmaceuticals announced that its phase 2a studies for oral oleoyl-estrone failed. The two studies demonstrated no clinically meaningful or statistically significant placebo adjusted weight loss.

== See also ==
- Lipoidal estradiol
