= Estradiol 17β-tetrahydropyranyl ether =

Chemical compound

Clinical data
- Other names: RS-2290; NSC-99694; Estra-1,3,5(10)-triene-17β-diol 17β-(tetrahydropyran-2-yl) ether; 17β-(Tetrahydro-2H-pyran-2-yloxy)estra-1,3,5(10)-trien-3-ol
- Routes of administration: By mouth
- Drug class: Estrogen; Estrogen ether

Identifiers
- IUPAC name: (8R,9S,13S,14S,17S)-13-methyl-17-(oxan-2-yloxy)-6,7,8,9,11,12,14,15,16,17-decahydrocyclopenta[a]phenanthren-3-ol
- CAS Number: 3589-90-0
- PubChem CID: 23618059
- ChemSpider: 19955297
- UNII: OEU4S60XOJ

Chemical and physical data
- Formula: C_{23}H_{32}O_{3}
- Molar mass: 356.506 g·mol^{−1}
- 3D model (JSmol): Interactive image
- SMILES: C[C@]12CC[C@H]3[C@H]([C@@H]1CC[C@@H]2OC4CCCCO4)CCC5=C3C=CC(=C5)O
- InChI: InChI=1S/C23H32O3/c1-23-12-11-18-17-8-6-16(24)14-15(17)5-7-19(18)20(23)9-10-21(23)26-22-4-2-3-13-25-22/h6,8,14,18-22,24H,2-5,7,9-13H2,1H3/t18-,19-,20+,21+,22?,23+/m1/s1; Key:DRRJWMXJIVWKKW-CUFSGNDSSA-N

Estradiol 17β-tetrahydropyranyl ether is a synthetic estrogen and estrogen ether which was never marketed. It has been reported to possess improved oral activity relative to estradiol. One study in animals found that it had 15 times the oral activity of estradiol.

== See also ==
- List of estrogen esters § Ethers of steroidal estrogens
