= Polyestriol phosphate =

Chemical compound

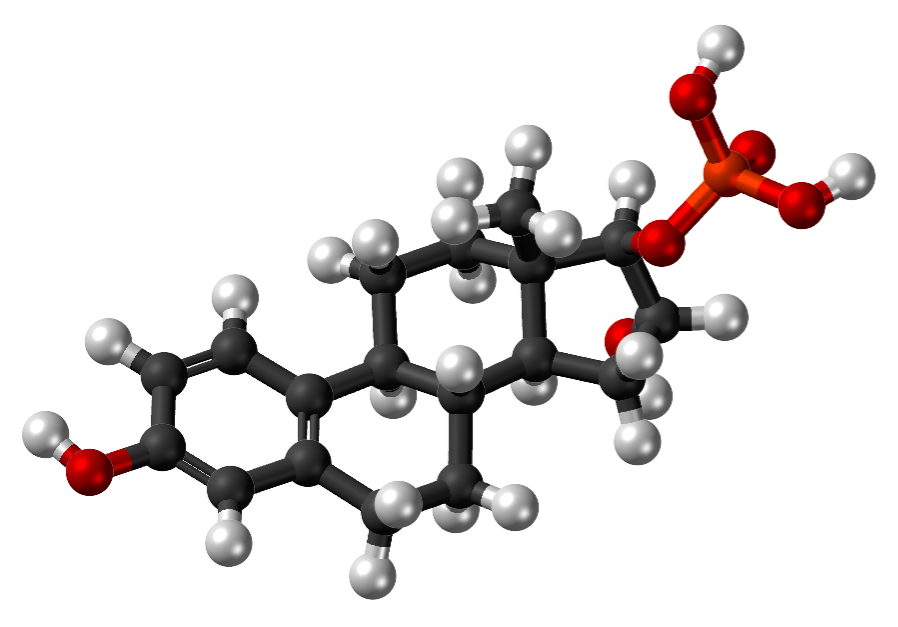
- Skeletal structure of polyestriol phosphate (top) and ball-and-stick model of estriol phosphate (one monomer of polyestriol phosphate) (bottom)

Clinical data
- Trade names: Gynäsan, Klimadurin, Triodurin
- Other names: PE3P; SEP; Poly(estriol phosphate); Estriol phosphate polymer; Estriol polymer with phosphoric acid
- Routes of administration: Intramuscular injection
- Drug class: Estrogen; Estrogen ester

Legal status
- Legal status: In general: ℞ (Prescription only)

Pharmacokinetic data
- Bioavailability: IM: High
- Metabolites: Estriol, phosphoric acid, and metabolites of estriol
- Excretion: Urine (as conjugates)

Identifiers
- IUPAC name: Estra-1,3,5(10)-triene-3,16α,17β-triol, polymer with phosphoric acid
- CAS Number: 37452-43-0
- UNII: H4BF1S56XC

Chemical and physical data
- Formula: (C_{18}H_{23}O_{5}P)_{n} (n = variable)
- Molar mass: Polymer: Variable; Repeat unit: 350.346 g/mol
- 3D model (JSmol): Interactive image
- SMILES: [*]Oc1ccc2[C@H]3CC[C@]4(C)[C@]5([C@@]6C[C@H]4[C@@H]3CCc2c1).O6.O5P([*])(=O)O

Polyestriol phosphate (PE3P, SEP), sold under the brand names Gynäsan, Klimadurin, and Triodurin, is an estrogen medication which was previously used in menopausal hormone therapy (i.e., to treat menopausal symptoms in postmenopausal women) and is no longer available.

== Medical uses ==
PE3P has been used at a dosage of 40 to 80 mg by intramuscular injection once every 4 to 8 weeks in menopausal hormone therapy.

=== Available forms ===
PE3P has been available in the form of ampoules containing 50 to 80 mg in 1 or 2 mL aqueous solution.

== Pharmacology ==
PE3P is similar to polyestradiol phosphate (PEP), and is, likewise, an estrogen ester – specifically, an ester and prodrug of estriol – in the form of a polymer with phosphate linkers. When adjusted for differences in molecular weight, PE3P contains the equivalent of about 80% of the amount of estriol. As such, 40 mg PE3P corresponds to about 32 mg estriol. Doses of PE3P of 10 mg or more have an extended duration of action. A single intramuscular injection of 80 mg PE3P has a duration of about 1 month and of 80 mg about 2 months.

The effects of PE3P on the vagina, uterus, pregnancy, prostate gland, coagulation, and fibrinolysis, as well as on mammary and endometrial cancer risk, have been studied. The endometrial proliferation dose of PE3P over 14 days in women is 40 to 60 mg by intramuscular injection.

Potencies and durations of natural estrogens by intramuscular injection
Estrogen	Form	Dose (mg)		Duration by dose (mg)
Estrogen	Form	EPD	CICD	Duration by dose (mg)
Estradiol	Aq. soln.	?	–	<1 d
Estradiol	Oil soln.	40–60	–	1–2 ≈ 1–2 d
Estradiol	Aq. susp.	?	3.5	0.5–2 ≈ 2–7 d; 3.5 ≈ >5 d
Estradiol	Microsph.	?	–	1 ≈ 30 d
Estradiol benzoate	Oil soln.	25–35	–	1.66 ≈ 2–3 d; 5 ≈ 3–6 d
Estradiol benzoate	Aq. susp.	20	–	10 ≈ 16–21 d
Estradiol benzoate	Emulsion	?	–	10 ≈ 14–21 d
Estradiol dipropionate	Oil soln.	25–30	–	5 ≈ 5–8 d
Estradiol valerate	Oil soln.	20–30	5	5 ≈ 7–8 d; 10 ≈ 10–14 d; 40 ≈ 14–21 d; 100 ≈ 21–28 d
Estradiol benz. butyrate	Oil soln.	?	10	10 ≈ 21 d
Estradiol cypionate	Oil soln.	20–30	–	5 ≈ 11–14 d
Estradiol cypionate	Aq. susp.	?	5	5 ≈ 14–24 d
Estradiol enanthate	Oil soln.	?	5–10	10 ≈ 20–30 d
Estradiol dienanthate	Oil soln.	?	–	7.5 ≈ >40 d
Estradiol undecylate	Oil soln.	?	–	10–20 ≈ 40–60 d; 25–50 ≈ 60–120 d
Polyestradiol phosphate	Aq. soln.	40–60	–	40 ≈ 30 d; 80 ≈ 60 d; 160 ≈ 120 d
Estrone	Oil soln.	?	–	1–2 ≈ 2–3 d
Estrone	Aq. susp.	?	–	0.1–2 ≈ 2–7 d
Estriol	Oil soln.	?	–	1–2 ≈ 1–4 d
Polyestriol phosphate	Aq. soln.	?	–	50 ≈ 30 d; 80 ≈ 60 d
Notes and sources Notes: All aqueous suspensions are of microcrystalline particle size. Estradiol production during the menstrual cycle is 30–640 µg/d (6.4–8.6 mg total per month or cycle). The vaginal epithelium maturation dosage of estradiol benzoate or estradiol valerate has been reported as 5 to 7 mg/week. An effective ovulation-inhibiting dose of estradiol undecylate is 20–30 mg/month. Sources: See template.

== Chemistry ==
PE3P is a water-soluble polymer of estriol with phosphoric acid.

== History ==
PE3P was developed by the Swedish pharmaceutical company Leo Läkemedel AB in the 1960s. It was introduced for medical use by 1968.

== Society and culture ==
=== Brand names ===
PE3P was marketed under brand names including Gynäsan, Klimadurin, and Triodurin.

=== Availability ===
PE3P was marketed in Germany and Spain.

== See also ==
- Estriol phosphate
- Polytestosterone phloretin phosphate
- Polydiethylstilbestrol phosphate
