= Estradiol dipropionate =

Chemical compound

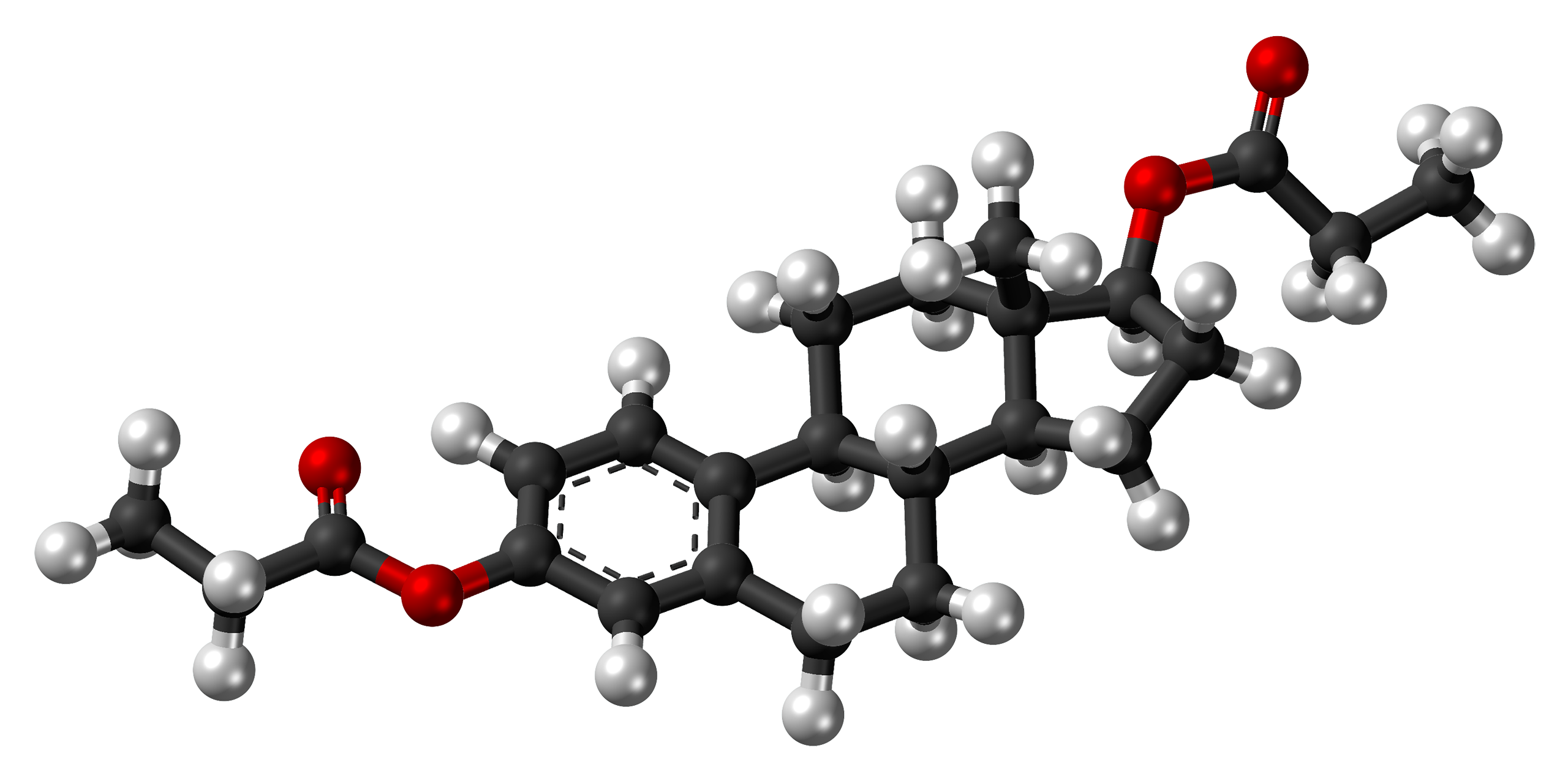

Clinical data
- Trade names: Agofollin, Di-Ovocylin, Progynon DP, others
- Other names: EDP; Estradiol dipropionate; Estradiol 3,17β-dipropionate; Estra-1,3,5(10)-triene-3,17β-diol 3,17β-dipropanoate
- Routes of administration: Intramuscular injection
- Drug class: Estrogen; Estrogen ester
- ATC code: G03CA03 (WHO)

Legal status
- Legal status: In general: ℞ (Prescription only)

Pharmacokinetic data
- Bioavailability: IM: High
- Protein binding: Estradiol: ~98% (to albumin and SHBG)
- Metabolism: Cleavage via esterases in the liver, blood, and tissues
- Metabolites: Estradiol, benzoic acid, and metabolites of estradiol
- Elimination half-life: Unknown
- Duration of action: IM (5 mg): 5–8 days
- Excretion: Urine

Identifiers
- IUPAC name: [(8R,9S,13S,14S,17S)-13-methyl-3-propanoyloxy-6,7,8,9,11,12,14,15,16,17-decahydrocyclopenta[a]phenanthren-17-yl] propanoate
- CAS Number: 113-38-2
- PubChem CID: 8225
- ChemSpider: 7932
- UNII: NIG5418BXB
- KEGG: D01617
- ChEBI: CHEBI:31560
- ChEMBL: ChEMBL1697791
- CompTox Dashboard (EPA): DTXSID8023000
- ECHA InfoCard: 100.003.660

Chemical and physical data
- Formula: C_{24}H_{32}O_{4}
- Molar mass: 384.516 g·mol^{−1}
- 3D model (JSmol): Interactive image
- SMILES: O=C(Oc1cc3c(cc1)[C@H]2CC[C@@]4([C@@H](OC(=O)CC)CC[C@H]4[C@@H]2CC3)C)CC
- InChI: InChI=1S/C24H32O4/c1-4-22(25)27-16-7-9-17-15(14-16)6-8-19-18(17)12-13-24(3)20(19)10-11-21(24)28-23(26)5-2/h7,9,14,18-21H,4-6,8,10-13H2,1-3H3/t18-,19-,20+,21+,24+/m1/s1; Key:JQIYNMYZKRGDFK-RUFWAXPRSA-N

Estradiol dipropionate (EDP), sold under the brand names Agofollin, Di-Ovocylin, and Progynon DP among others, is an estrogen medication which has been used in hormone therapy for menopausal symptoms and low estrogen levels in women and in the treatment of gynecological disorders. It has also been used in feminizing hormone therapy for transgender women and in the treatment of prostate cancer in men. Although widely used in the past, estradiol dipropionate has largely been discontinued and is mostly no longer available today. It appears to remain in use only in Japan, Macedonia, and Australia. Estradiol dipropionate is given by injection into muscle at intervals ranging from once or twice a week to once every week and a half to two weeks.

Side effects of estradiol dipropionate include breast tenderness, breast enlargement, nausea, headache, and fluid retention. Estradiol dipropionate is an estrogen and hence is an agonist of the estrogen receptor, the biological target of estrogens like estradiol. It is an estrogen ester and a prodrug of estradiol in the body. Because of this, it is considered to be a natural and bioidentical form of estrogen.

Estradiol dipropionate was patented in 1937 and was introduced for medical use by 1940. It was one of the earliest estradiol esters to be used. Along with estradiol benzoate, estradiol dipropionate was among the most widely used esters of estradiol for many years following its introduction.

== Medical uses ==
The medical uses of estradiol dipropionate are the same as those of estradiol and other estrogens. Estradiol dipropionate is used in hormone therapy for the treatment of menopausal symptoms such as hot flashes and vaginal atrophy and in the treatment of hypoestrogenism and delayed puberty due to hypogonadism or other causes in women. It is also used in feminizing hormone therapy for transgender women. Aside from hormone therapy, estradiol dipropionate is used in the treatment of gynecological disorders such as menstrual disorders, dysfunctional uterine bleeding, and breast engorgement. In addition, it is used as a form of high-dose estrogen therapy in the palliative treatment of prostate cancer in men.

Estradiol dipropionate has typically been used at a dosage of 1 to 5 mg once or twice per week by intramuscular injection for relevant indications. It has been used in the treatment of menopausal symptoms at a dosage of 1 to 5 mg initially for two to three injections and 1 to 2.5 mg for maintenance once every 10 to 14 days, and in the treatment of hypoestrogenism and delayed puberty at a dosage of 2.5 to 5 mg once per week. As a component of feminizing hormone therapy for transgender women, estradiol dipropionate has been used at dosages of 2 to 10 mg once per week or 5 to 20 mg once every 2 weeks. In the treatment of prostate cancer, estradiol dipropionate has been used at a dosage of 5 mg once per week.

=== Available forms ===
Estradiol dipropionate was previously available by itself as an oil solution for intramuscular injection provided as vials and ampoules at concentrations of 0.1, 0.2, 0.5, 1, 2.5, and 5 mg/mL. The medication has largely been discontinued, with most of these formulations no longer being available. Estradiol dipropionate remains available at a concentration of 1 mg/mL in combination with 50 mg/mL hydroxyprogesterone caproate under the brand name EP Hormone Depot (Teikoku Zoki Pharmaceutical Company) in Japan.

== Contraindications ==
Contraindications of estrogens include coagulation problems, cardiovascular diseases, liver disease, and certain hormone-sensitive cancers such as breast cancer and endometrial cancer, among others.

== Side effects ==
The side effects of estradiol dipropionate are the same as those of estradiol. Examples of such side effects include breast tenderness and enlargement, nausea, bloating, edema, headache, and melasma.

== Overdose ==
Symptoms of estrogen overdosage may include nausea, vomiting, bloating, increased weight, water retention, breast tenderness, vaginal discharge, heavy legs, and leg cramps. These side effects can be diminished by reducing the estrogen dosage.

== Interactions ==
Inhibitors and inducers of cytochrome P450 may influence the metabolism of estradiol and by extension circulating estradiol levels.

== Pharmacology ==
Estradiol, the active form of estradiol dipropionate.

=== Pharmacodynamics ===
Estradiol dipropionate is an estradiol ester, or a prodrug of estradiol. As such, it is an estrogen, or an agonist of the estrogen receptors. Estradiol dipropionate is of about 41% higher molecular weight than estradiol due to the presence of its C3 and C17β propionate esters. Because estradiol dipropionate is a prodrug of estradiol, it is considered to be a natural and bioidentical form of estrogen.

Potencies and durations of natural estrogens by intramuscular injection
Estrogen	Form	Dose (mg)		Duration by dose (mg)
Estrogen	Form	EPD	CICD	Duration by dose (mg)
Estradiol	Aq. soln.	?	–	<1 d
Estradiol	Oil soln.	40–60	–	1–2 ≈ 1–2 d
Estradiol	Aq. susp.	?	3.5	0.5–2 ≈ 2–7 d; 3.5 ≈ >5 d
Estradiol	Microsph.	?	–	1 ≈ 30 d
Estradiol benzoate	Oil soln.	25–35	–	1.66 ≈ 2–3 d; 5 ≈ 3–6 d
Estradiol benzoate	Aq. susp.	20	–	10 ≈ 16–21 d
Estradiol benzoate	Emulsion	?	–	10 ≈ 14–21 d
Estradiol dipropionate	Oil soln.	25–30	–	5 ≈ 5–8 d
Estradiol valerate	Oil soln.	20–30	5	5 ≈ 7–8 d; 10 ≈ 10–14 d; 40 ≈ 14–21 d; 100 ≈ 21–28 d
Estradiol benz. butyrate	Oil soln.	?	10	10 ≈ 21 d
Estradiol cypionate	Oil soln.	20–30	–	5 ≈ 11–14 d
Estradiol cypionate	Aq. susp.	?	5	5 ≈ 14–24 d
Estradiol enanthate	Oil soln.	?	5–10	10 ≈ 20–30 d
Estradiol dienanthate	Oil soln.	?	–	7.5 ≈ >40 d
Estradiol undecylate	Oil soln.	?	–	10–20 ≈ 40–60 d; 25–50 ≈ 60–120 d
Polyestradiol phosphate	Aq. soln.	40–60	–	40 ≈ 30 d; 80 ≈ 60 d; 160 ≈ 120 d
Estrone	Oil soln.	?	–	1–2 ≈ 2–3 d
Estrone	Aq. susp.	?	–	0.1–2 ≈ 2–7 d
Estriol	Oil soln.	?	–	1–2 ≈ 1–4 d
Polyestriol phosphate	Aq. soln.	?	–	50 ≈ 30 d; 80 ≈ 60 d
Notes and sources Notes: All aqueous suspensions are of microcrystalline particle size. Estradiol production during the menstrual cycle is 30–640 µg/d (6.4–8.6 mg total per month or cycle). The vaginal epithelium maturation dosage of estradiol benzoate or estradiol valerate has been reported as 5 to 7 mg/week. An effective ovulation-inhibiting dose of estradiol undecylate is 20–30 mg/month. Sources: See template.

=== Pharmacokinetics ===
Compared to estradiol benzoate, a related estradiol ester, estradiol dipropionate has enhanced and prolonged effects. Whereas the duration of action of estradiol benzoate is said to be 2 to 3 days, the duration of estradiol dipropionate has been said to be 1 to 2 weeks. However, newer estradiol esters have longer durations than either estradiol benzoate or estradiol dipropionate; the duration of estradiol valerate has been said to be 1 to 3 weeks, and the duration of estradiol cypionate has been said to be 3 to 4 weeks. A single intramuscular injection of 5 mg estradiol dipropionate has a duration of about 5 to 8 days.

A single intramuscular injection of 50 μg/kg estradiol dipropionate in oil in 15 pubertal girls (about 1 mg for a 50-kg (110-lb) girl) was found to produce peak estradiol levels of about 215 pg/mL after 1.5 days. Estradiol levels declined to about 90 pg/mL after 4 days.

Hormone levels with estradiol dipropionate by intramuscular injection
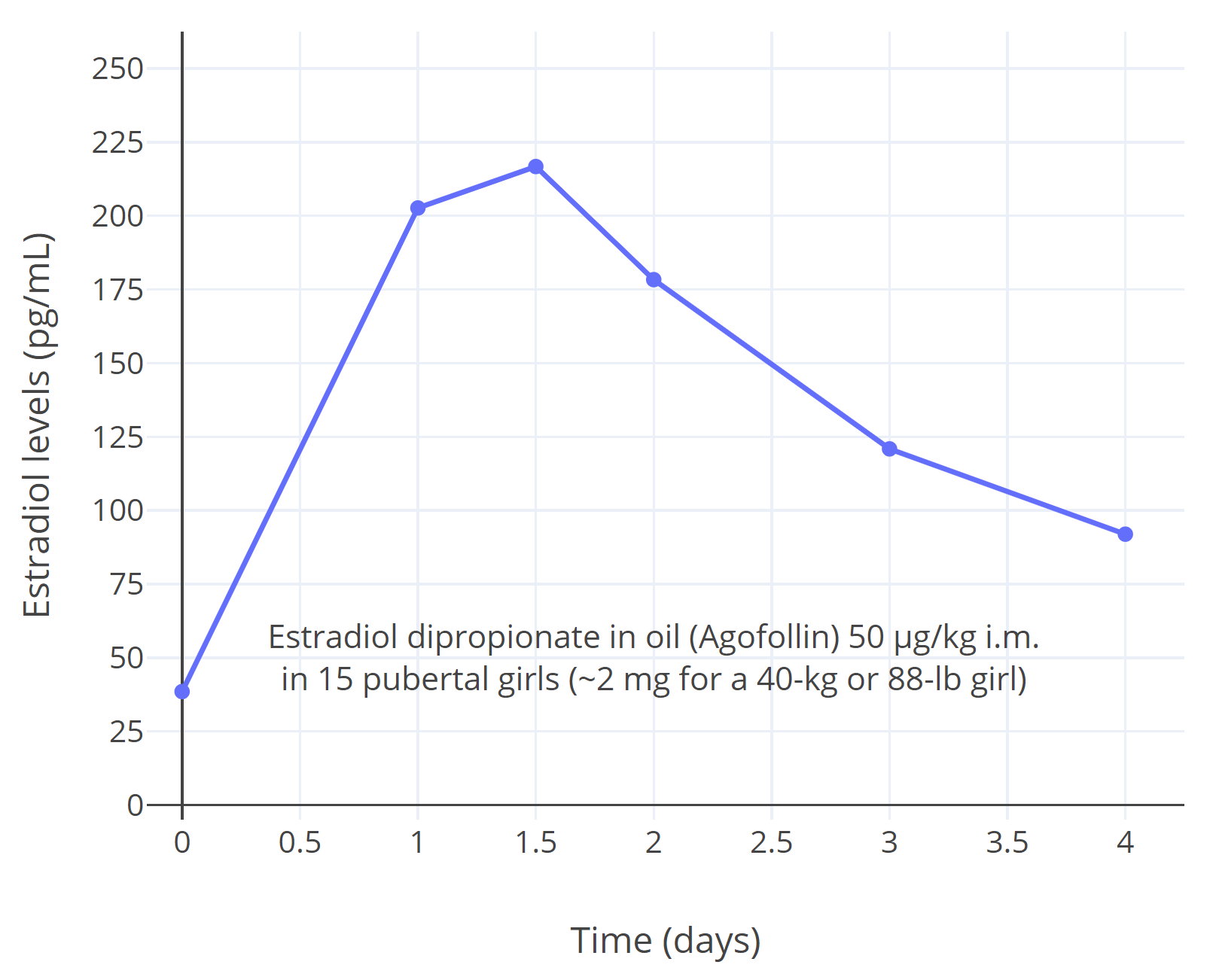
Estradiol levels after a single intramuscular injection of 50 μg/kg estradiol dipropionate in oil in pubertal girls. This dose would be 1 mg in a 50-kg (110-lb) girl. Source was Presl et al. (1976).

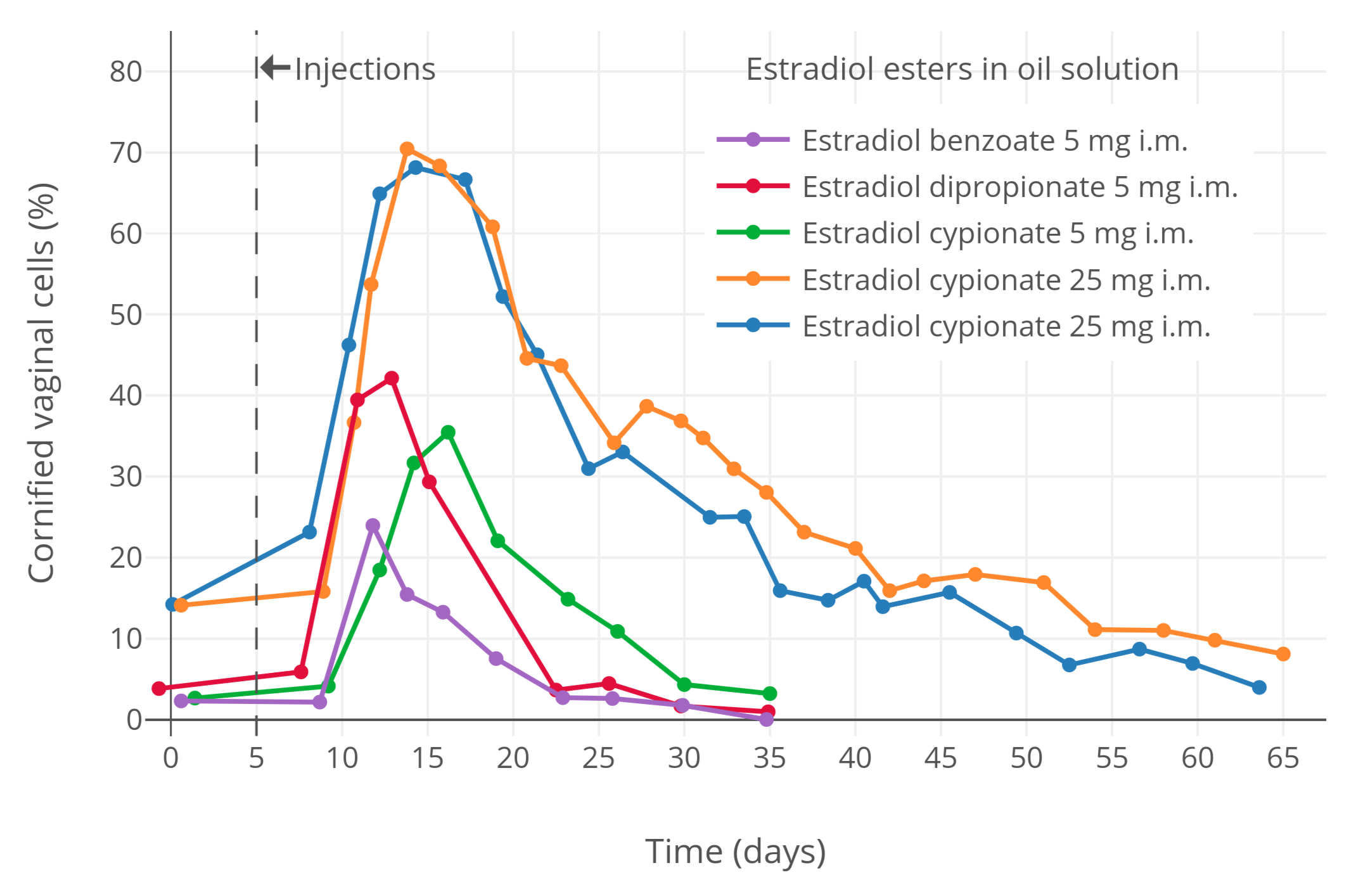
Vaginal cornification with a single intramuscular injection of different estradiol esters in oil solution in women. Source was Schwartz & Soule (1955).

== Chemistry ==
Estradiol dipropionate, also known as estradiol 3,17β-dipropionate, is a synthetic estrane steroid and a derivative of estradiol. It is an estrogen ester; specifically, it is the C3,17β dipropionate ester of estradiol.

The experimental octanol/water partition coefficient (logP) of estradiol dipropionate is 4.9.

Structural properties of selected estradiol esters
Estrogen	Structure	Ester(s)				Relative mol. weight	Relative E2 content^{b}	log P^{c}
Estrogen	Structure	Position(s)	Moiet(ies)	Type	Length^{a}	Relative mol. weight	Relative E2 content^{b}	log P^{c}
Estradiol		–	–	–	–	1.00	1.00	4.0
Estradiol acetate		C3	Ethanoic acid	Straight-chain fatty acid	2	1.15	0.87	4.2
Estradiol benzoate		C3	Benzoic acid	Aromatic fatty acid	– (~4–5)	1.38	0.72	4.7
Estradiol dipropionate		C3, C17β	Propanoic acid (×2)	Straight-chain fatty acid	3 (×2)	1.41	0.71	4.9
Estradiol valerate		C17β	Pentanoic acid	Straight-chain fatty acid	5	1.31	0.76	5.6–6.3
Estradiol benzoate butyrate		C3, C17β	Benzoic acid, butyric acid	Mixed fatty acid	– (~6, 2)	1.64	0.61	6.3
Estradiol cypionate		C17β	Cyclopentylpropanoic acid	Cyclic fatty acid	– (~6)	1.46	0.69	6.9
Estradiol enanthate		C17β	Heptanoic acid	Straight-chain fatty acid	7	1.41	0.71	6.7–7.3
Estradiol dienanthate		C3, C17β	Heptanoic acid (×2)	Straight-chain fatty acid	7 (×2)	1.82	0.55	8.1–10.4
Estradiol undecylate		C17β	Undecanoic acid	Straight-chain fatty acid	11	1.62	0.62	9.2–9.8
Estradiol stearate		C17β	Octadecanoic acid	Straight-chain fatty acid	18	1.98	0.51	12.2–12.4
Estradiol distearate		C3, C17β	Octadecanoic acid (×2)	Straight-chain fatty acid	18 (×2)	2.96	0.34	20.2
Estradiol sulfate		C3	Sulfuric acid	Water-soluble conjugate	–	1.29	0.77	0.3–3.8
Estradiol glucuronide		C17β	Glucuronic acid	Water-soluble conjugate	–	1.65	0.61	2.1–2.7
Estramustine phosphate^{d}		C3, C17β	Normustine, phosphoric acid	Water-soluble conjugate	–	1.91	0.52	2.9–5.0
Polyestradiol phosphate^{e}		C3–C17β	Phosphoric acid	Water-soluble conjugate	–	1.23^{f}	0.81^{f}	2.9^{g}
Footnotes: ^{a} = Length of ester in carbon atoms for straight-chain fatty acids or approximate length of ester in carbon atoms for aromatic or cyclic fatty acids. ^{b} = Relative estradiol content by weight (i.e., relative estrogenic exposure). ^{c} = Experimental or predicted octanol/water partition coefficient (i.e., lipophilicity/hydrophobicity). Retrieved from PubChem, ChemSpider, and DrugBank. ^{d} = Also known as estradiol normustine phosphate. ^{e} = Polymer of estradiol phosphate (~13 repeat units). ^{f} = Relative molecular weight or estradiol content per repeat unit. ^{g} = log P of repeat unit (i.e., estradiol phosphate). Sources: See individual articles.

== History ==
Estradiol dipropionate was first synthesized and patented in 1937. It was assessed in clinical studies by 1939 and was introduced by Ciba as an oil solution for use by intramuscular injection under the brand name Di-Ovocylin by the same year. Other formulations such as Ovocyclin P by Ciba, Progynon DP by Schering and Dimenformon Dipropionate by Roche-Organon were also marketed by the early 1940s. Later in the 1940s the brand name Di-Ovocylin was changed by Ciba to Ovocylin Dipropionate. Along with estradiol benzoate, which was introduced in 1933, estradiol dipropionate was one of the first estradiol esters to be introduced for medical use. Prior to the development and introduction of longer-acting estradiol esters like estradiol valerate and estradiol cypionate in the 1950s, estradiol dipropionate and estradiol benzoate were the most widely used estradiol esters.

== Society and culture ==
=== Generic names ===
Estradiol dipropionate is the generic name of the drug and its INNM, BANM, and JAN.

=== Brand names ===
Estradiol dipropionate has been marketed under a variety of brand names, including Agofollin, Akrofolline, Dihidrofolina "Kével", Dimenformon, Dimenformon Dipropionate, Diovocylin, Di-Ovocylin, Diprostron, Diprovex, Endofollicolina D.P., EP Hormone Depot (in combination with hydroxyprogesterone caproate), Estroici, Estronex, Follicyclin, Follicyclin P, Follikelmon Depot, Horiken-Depot, Nacyclyl, Oestradiol Galenika, Oestradiol Streuli, Orofollina, Ovacrin, Ovahormon Depot, Ovocylin, Ovocylin Dipropionate, Ovocylin P, and Progynon DP, among others. Agofollin was an oil solution of estradiol dipropionate that was previously marketed in the Czech Republic and Slovakia.

=== Availability ===
Estradiol dipropionate has been discontinued in most countries, but remains available in Japan and Macedonia alone under the brand names Ovahormon and Oestradiol Galenika and/or in combination with hydroxyprogesterone caproate under the brand name EP Hormone Depot. It is also marketed for use in veterinary medicine in combination with hydroxyprogesterone caproate and nandrolone decanoate under the brand name Reepair in Australia.

== See also ==
- Estradiol dipropionate/hydroxyprogesterone caproate
