= Hydroxyprogesterone heptanoate =

Chemical compound

Clinical data
- Trade names: H.O.P, Hydroxyprogesterone, Lutogil A.P., Lutogyl A.P., others
- Other names: OHPH; Hydroxyprogesterone enanthate; OHPE; 17α-Hydroxyprogesterone heptanoate; 17α-Hydroxyprogesterone heptylate; 17α-Hydroxypregn-4-ene-3,20-dione 17α-heptanoate; 17α-Heptyloylpregn-4-ene-3,20-dione
- Routes of administration: Intramuscular injection
- Drug class: Progestogen; Progestin; Progestogen ester
- ATC code: G03DA03 (WHO)

Identifiers
- IUPAC name: [(8R,9S,10R,13S,14S,17R)-17-Acetyl-10,13-dimethyl-3-oxo-2,6,7,8,9,11,12,14,15,16-decahydro-1H-cyclopenta[a]phenanthren-17-yl] heptanoate
- CAS Number: 4596-16-1 1079269-78-5
- PubChem CID: 94296
- ChemSpider: 85099
- UNII: HGN17RX8K8
- CompTox Dashboard (EPA): DTXSID70196666
- ECHA InfoCard: 100.022.724

Chemical and physical data
- Formula: C_{28}H_{42}O_{4}
- Molar mass: 442.640 g·mol^{−1}
- 3D model (JSmol): Interactive image
- SMILES: CCCCCCC(=O)OC1(CCC2C1(CCC3C2CCC4=CC(=O)CCC34C)C)C(=O)C
- InChI: InChI=1S/C28H42O4/c1-5-6-7-8-9-25(31)32-28(19(2)29)17-14-24-22-11-10-20-18-21(30)12-15-26(20,3)23(22)13-16-27(24,28)4/h18,22-24H,5-17H2,1-4H3/t22-,23+,24+,26+,27+,28+/m1/s1; Key:NKJYZYWCGKSMSV-BDPSOKNUSA-N

Hydroxyprogesterone heptanoate (OHPH), also known as hydroxyprogesterone enanthate (OHPE) and sold under the brand names H.O.P., Lutogil A.P., and Lutogyl A.P. among others, is a progestin medication used for progestogenic indications. It has been formulated both alone and in together with estrogens, androgens/anabolic steroids, and other progestogens in several combination preparations (brand names Tocogestan, Trioestrine Retard, and Triormon Depositum). OHPH is given by injection into muscle at regular intervals.

OHPH is a progestin, or a synthetic progestogen, and hence is an agonist of the progesterone receptor, the biological target of progestogens like progesterone. It appears to have similar pharmacology to that of the closely related medication hydroxyprogesterone caproate (OHPC).

OHPH was first described by 1954 and was introduced for medical use by 1957. It has been used clinically in France and Monaco in the past but is no longer marketed.

== Medical uses ==
OHPH is a progestogen and was used in situations in which progestogens were indicated.

=== Available forms ===
OHPH was provided as a 125 mg/1 mL oil solution for use by intramuscular injection. In addition to single-drug preparations, OHPH has also been used in a number of multi-drug formulations. It was used in Tocogestan, a combination of 50 mg progesterone, 200 mg OHPH, and 250 mg α-tocopherol palmitate (vitamin E) in oil solution for use by intramuscular injection. It was also used in Triormon Depositum (estradiol dibutyrate, testosterone caproate, and OHPH) and Trioestrine Retard (estradiol diundecylate, testosterone cyclohexylpropionate, and OHPH). OHPH was a component of the experimental preparation Trophobolene (or Trophoboline), which also contained estrapronicate (estradiol nicotinate propionate) and nandrolone undecanoate, as well.

== Pharmacology ==
=== Pharmacodynamics ===
OHPH is a progestin, or a synthetic progestogen, and hence is an agonist of the progesterone receptor, the biological target of progestogens like progesterone. The progestogenic potency of OHPH in the uterus is equal to or greater than that of progesterone when administered by subcutaneous injection in animals. Its potency in animals likewise appears to be similar to that of hydroxyprogesterone caproate.

=== Pharmacokinetics ===
OHPH shows a pronounced depot effect when administered by subcutaneous injection in animals, similarly to the closely related medication hydroxyprogesterone caproate. The oral activity of OHPH in animals does not appear to have been assessed.

== Chemistry ==
OHPH, also known as hydroxyprogesterone enanthate (OHPE), as well as 17α-hydroxyprogesterone heptanoate or 17α-hydroxypregn-4-ene-3,20-dione 17α-heptanoate, is a synthetic pregnane steroid and a derivative of progesterone and 17α-hydroxyprogesterone. It is a progestogen ester; specifically, it is the C17α heptanoate (enanthate) ester of 17α-hydroxyprogesterone. Analogues of OHPH include the more well-known medications hydroxyprogesterone acetate and hydroxyprogesterone caproate (hydroxyprogesterone hexanoate). The C3 benzilic acid hydrazone of OHPH, hydroxyprogesterone heptanoate benzilic acid hydrazone (OHPHBH), is known and has been studied in animals. In terms of chemical structure, OHPH is very similar to hydroxyprogesterone caproate, differing from it only in having one additional carbon in its fatty acid ester chain.

== History ==
OHPH was first described, along with hydroxyprogesterone caproate and hydroxyprogesterone acetate, by Karl Junkmann of Schering AG in 1954. It was introduced for medical use by 1957. OHPH was commercialized by Roussel and Théramex, and has been used clinically in France and Monaco but is no longer marketed.

== Society and culture ==
=== Brand names ===
OHPH has been marketed alone under a number of brand names including H.O.P, Hydroxyprogesterone, Lutogil A.P., and Lutogyl A.P.

=== Availability ===
OHPH was previously marketed in France and Monaco but is no longer available.

== See also ==
- Estradiol dibutyrate/hydroxyprogesterone heptanoate/testosterone caproate
- Estradiol diundecylate/hydroxyprogesterone heptanoate/testosterone cyclohexylpropionate
- Estrapronicate/hydroxyprogesterone heptanoate/nandrolone undecanoate
- Progesterone/hydroxyprogesterone heptanoate/α-tocopherol palmitate
