= C29H38O3 =

The molecular formula C_{29}H_{38}O_{3} (molar mass: 434.61 g/mol) may refer to:

- Oxogestone phenpropionate (OPP)
- Testosterone phenylbutyrate, also known as testosterone phenylbutanoate
