= 2019–2020 vaping lung illness outbreak =

Outbreak of vaping-associated pulmonary injury

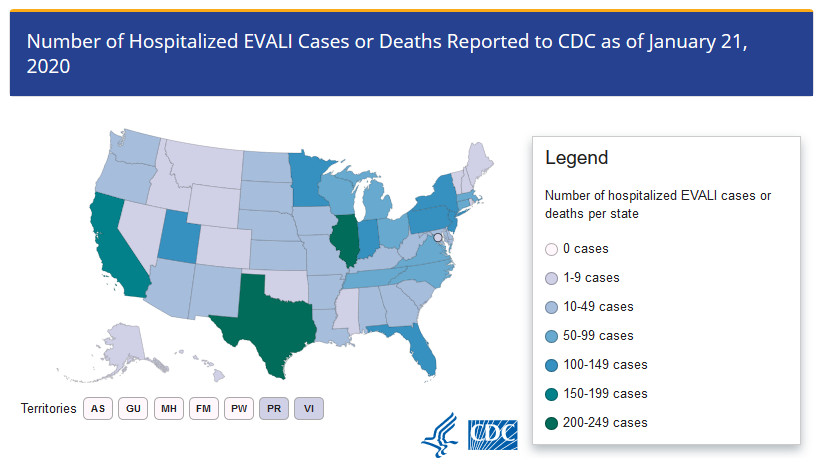
- Map of reported hospitalized cases or deaths in the US and US territories.
- Disease: Vaping-associated pulmonary injury
- Location: United States
- First outbreak: 2019; 7 years ago
- First reported: April 2019; 7 years ago
- Confirmed cases: 2,711
- Deaths: 69

An outbreak of e-cigarette, or vaping, product use-associated lung injury began in 2019 among users of illegal, unregulated cannabis vaping products, almost exclusively in the United States. The first cases were identified in Illinois and Wisconsin in April 2019; as of 18 February 2020, a total of 2,807 hospitalized cases, including 68 deaths, had been confirmed. According to the U.S. Centers for Disease Control (CDC), "Vitamin E acetate is strongly linked to the outbreak...Evidence is not sufficient to rule out the contribution of other chemicals of concern, including chemicals in either THC or non-THC products".

Cases peaked in September 2019, and declined thereafter. The decline led CDC to stop reporting cases in February 2020, but as of December 2020, continued to monitor cases arriving in emergency departments. Some states continued to record new cases. As of January 2022, California had reported at least 40 cases diagnosed after February 2020. As of March 2022, cases continued to be diagnosed. At least 73 cases were diagnosed in Utah after February 2020.

CDC investigators identified direct exposure to chemicals present in illegal cannabis vaping products as the likely culprit, but did not rule out chemicals in nicotine vapes as possible causes. CDC: "No specific e-cigarette device or substance has been linked to all cases, and e-cigarettes include a variety of chemical and additives". 84% of patients studied by the CDC reported THC use. The majority of those affected were adults aged 18–34, the biggest cannabis vapers in the US.

== Background ==
Nicotine-containing products are regulated in the U.S. by the Food and Drug Administration (FDA) which has not approved any e-cigarette product for sale; THC products are illegal under federal law, but allowed by some states. The outbreak occurred against the broader rise of non-combustible tobacco and nicotine products, including e-cigarettes, heated tobacco products and nicotine pouches. These products expanded as cigarette smoking declined and tobacco companies introduced new forms of nicotine delivery. Public health authorities generally distinguish these products from combustible cigarettes: they are not risk-free, but some non-combusted nicotine products may expose adult smokers to fewer harmful chemicals if they switch completely from cigarettes. The 2019–2020 lung injury outbreak, however, was linked most to THC-containing vaping products, particularly products obtained from informal or illicit sources, and to vitamin E acetate used as an additive in some THC vape cartridges.

A 2020 review stated "Initial case reports of vaping-related lung injury date back to 2012, but the ongoing outbreak of EVALI began in the summer of 2019..." At least 19 cases of vaping-associated pulmonary injuries had been reported worldwide prior to 2019. Similar cases were reported in the UK and Japan before the outbreak.

The first case of e-cigarettes inducing lipid pneumonia was documented in the medical literature in 2012; the causative agent was identified as glycerin. Glycerin was long thought to be a safe e-liquid additive. However, formaldehyde is a known product of propylene glycol and glycerol vapor degradation, and may cause lung inflammation.

Lipid pneumonia is known to cause lung inflammation, with exogenous and endogenous factors that cause this disease.

EVALI is a diagnosis of exclusion as the symptoms are diffuse and mostly non-specific. Confirmed cases have the following features:

- use of e-cigarettes in the 90 days prior to symptom onset;
- pulmonary infiltrates on chest CT scans;
- absence of pulmonary infection;
- no other possible alternative diagnoses.

== History ==
Prior to the outbreak, vitamin E acetate was used in concentrations under 20% of the formula in vape cartridges, as a thickening agent. As a result of a limited availability of cannabis in California, as well as high demand, illicit sellers used 50% or higher concentrations of diluent thickeners to add bulk to low potency cartridges. Vitamin E acetate is a common choice because it resembles THC oil.

In 2019, an outbreak of severe vaping-associated lung illness afflicted certain users of vaping products in the United States. (Note: All patients have reported using vaping products. The outbreak raised concern among public health officials, and revived the debate regarding the effects of vaping. This was the first time that vaping products has were linked to an outbreak of lung illness. Except for one confirmed case in Canada, it seemed to be occurring only in the US.) Cases were first identified in Illinois and Wisconsin in April 2019.

In September 2019, New York Governor Andrew Cuomo instructed the state health department to issue subpoenas against three sellers of thickening agents used in illicit vaping products.

The e-cigarette industry blamed illicit vaping liquids. Juul Labs stated that some news reports state that several cases of lung illness were associated with vaping THC.

By September 2019 the CDC and FDA recommended that the public should consider not using vaping products during their investigation, particularly those containing THC or vitamin E acetate from informal sources. EVALI cases declined after September 2019.

In January 2020, the CDC continued its investigation into the outbreak of vaping-associated lung injuries. Data collected from patients showed that 82% had reported using THC-containing products. As of February 18, 2020, a total of 2,807 hospitalized cases had been reported to CDC, across all 50 states, the District of Columbia, and two US territories (Puerto Rico and US Virgin Islands). 68 deaths had been confirmed in 29 states and the District of Columbia as of February 18, 2020. Symptoms typically developed over several days but sometimes stretched to several weeks. The outbreak mainly affected young people, the largest cannabis users.

Some jurisdictions restricted the sale of products containing vitamin E acetate and other chemicals in response to the outbreak. The DEA and the FDA shut down 44 websites for advertising illegal e-cigarette cartridges.

== Treatment ==
As of October 18, 2019, the CDC has published updated interim guidance based on the most current data to provide a framework for healthcare providers in their management and follow-up of persons with symptoms of VAPI. Initial management involves deciding whether to admit a patient with possible VAPI to the hospital. Currently, the CDC recommends that patients with suspected VAPI should be admitted if they have decreased O_{2} saturation (<95%) on room air, are in respiratory distress, or have comorbidities that compromise pulmonary reserve.

Once admitted, initiation of corticosteroids should be considered, which have been found to be helpful in treating this injury. Several case reports describe improvement with corticosteroids, likely because of a blunting of the inflammatory response. In a group of patients in Illinois and Wisconsin, 92% of 50 patients received corticosteroids, and those that began glucocorticoid therapy continued on it for at least seven days.

The medical team documented in 65% of 46 patient notes that "respiratory improvement was due to the use of glucocorticoids". Among 140 cases reported nationally to the CDC that received corticosteroids, 82% of patients improved. In patients with more severe illness, a more aggressive empiric therapy with corticosteroids as well as antimicrobial and antiviral therapy may be warranted.

As a large proportion of patients were admitted to an intensive care unit based on data submitted to the CDC, many patients require supplemental oxygen via nasal cannula, high-flow oxygen, bilevel positive airway pressure (BiPAP), or mechanical ventilation.

During influenza season, health care providers should consider influenza in all patients with suspected VAPI. Decisions on initiation or discontinuation of treatment should be based on specific clinical features and, when appropriate, in consultation with specialists.

Special consideration should be given to high-risk patients such as the elderly, those with a history of cardiac or lung disease, or pregnant individuals. Patients over 50 years old have an increased risk of intubation and might need longer hospitalizations. CDC says patients should be advised to discontinue the use of vaping products upon hospital admission and during outpatient follow-up, to speed recovery and avoid potential recurrence of symptoms or lung injury. Evidence-based tobacco product quitting strategies include behavioral counseling and U.S. Food and Drug Administration (US FDA)-approved cessation medications.

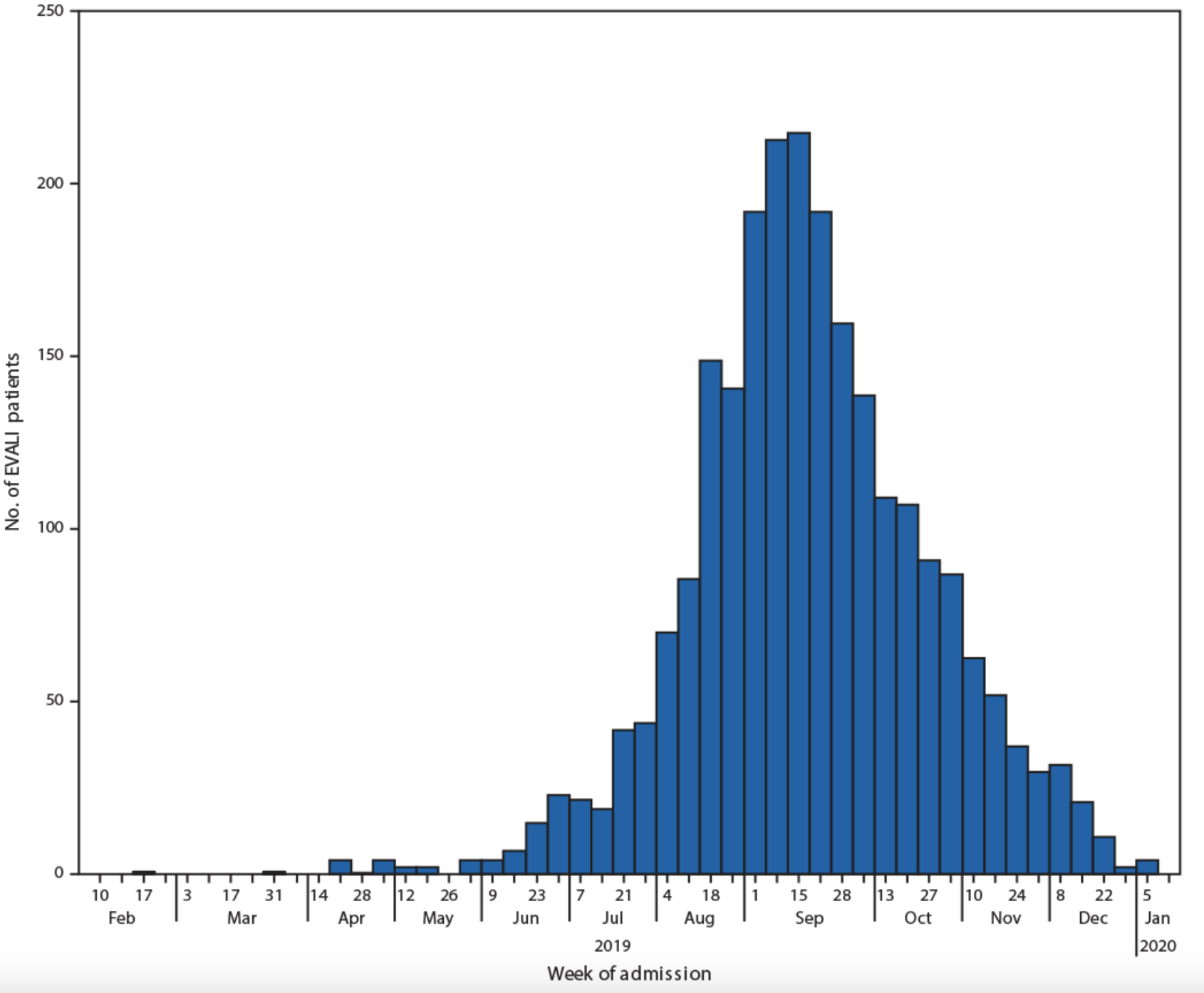
Chart from the CDC in 2020 showing the number of EVALI cases by week of hospital admission from February 2019 - January 2020.

Treatment for EVALI varies. Around 95% of patients require hospitalization. Pharmacological management includes antibiotics and potentially antivirals as well as corticosteroids. Many hospitalized patients have also required supplemental oxygen and ventilation therapy. Most EVALI cases are resolved when the patient quits vaping.On September 6, 2019, Dr. Dana Meaney-Delman, serving as the incident manager of the Centers for Disease Control and Prevention's (CDC) response to this outbreak, said that "Based on the clinical and laboratory evidence to date, we believe that a chemical exposure is likely associated with these illnesses." Of the 2,506 reported cases, information is available in the three months prior to symptom onset for 1,782 of them as of December 3, 2019. 80% reported THC use, 35% reported exclusive THC use, about 54% reported using nicotine-containing products, and 13% reported exclusive use of nicotine-containing products. Many of the samples tested by the states or by the US Food and Drug Administration (US FDA) as part of the 2019 investigation have been identified as vaping products containing tetrahydrocannabinol (or THC, a psychoactive component of the cannabis plant). Most of those samples with THC tested also contained significant amounts of vitamin E acetate. A case-control study reported vitamin E acetate in the brochoalveolar lavage fluid of 94% of 51 EVALI patients and in none in 99 healthy controls in the comparator group. The CDC reported that their findings suggest vaping products containing THC are linked to most of the cases and play a major role in the outbreak. The CDC stated that the chemical vitamin E acetate is a very strong culprit of concern in the lung illnesses related to THC-based vaping products, but did not rule out other chemicals as possible causes. (Note: Research suggests when vitamin E acetate is inhaled, it may interfere with normal lung functioning. Vitamin E acetate is used as an additive in the production of e-cigarette, or vaping, products, because it resembles THC oil. Vitamin E acetate is also used as a thickening ingredient in e-liquid.)

== Public health recommendations ==
The CDC recommends that the public should consider not using any vaping products during their investigation, particularly those containing THC from informal sources like friends, family, or in-person or online dealers as of 20 November 2019. The CDC recommends that e-cigarette, or vaping, products should never be used by youths, young adults, or women who are pregnant. Adults who do not currently use tobacco products should not start using e-cigarettes or vaping products, according to the CDC.

== United States ==
Cases involved in the outbreak of severe vaping-associated pulmonary injury were first identified in Illinois and Wisconsin in April 2019. As of 18 February 2020, a total of 2,807 hospitalized cases of lung illness associated with the use of vaping products have been reported to the Centers for Disease Control and Prevention (CDC) from 50 states, the District of Columbia, and two US territories (Puerto Rico and US Virgin Islands). The potential cases of severe lung illness have been associated with the use of vaping products such as devices, liquids, refill pods, and cartridges. On 12 September 2019, the CDC no longer reported possible cases. The CDC changed its reporting methodology from counting possible cases, to reporting probable and confirmed cases where patients recently vaped, developed a breathing illness, and either had some tests that were performed to rule out infection, or testing did not show an infection. The CDC stated the possible cases are still under investigation at the state level.

As of 3 December 2019, the CDC is only reporting hospitalized vaping-associated lung illness cases and vaping-associated lung illness deaths, regardless of hospitalization status. As of 15 October 2019, the CDC has reported on 1,358 people with data on age and gender: 70% of people are male. The median age of persons is 24 years, and ages range from 13 to 75 years. 79% of persons are under 35 years old. Prevalence of lung disease attributable to vaping is likely under reported, as cases brought to the CDC are some of the most severe.

Symptoms typically develop over a period of days, but can sometimes manifest over several weeks. In many cases, patients reported a gradual start of symptoms, including: breathing difficulty, shortness of breath, and/or chest pain before being admitted to a hospital for more deliberate treatment by professional medical experts. Based on reports from several states, patients have experienced respiratory symptoms (cough, shortness of breath, or chest pain), while some have also experienced gastrointestinal symptoms (nausea, vomiting, or diarrhea) or non-specific symptoms (fatigue, fever, or weight loss).

Some cases reported mild to moderate gastrointestinal illness. Some patients have reported that their symptoms developed over a few days, while others have reported that their symptoms developed over several weeks. Some patients have reported that their gastrointestinal symptoms began before their respiratory symptoms. Fever, elevated heart rate, and elevated white blood cell count have been reported, even though no infectious disease has been identified. Many patients sought medical care in ambulatory settings, sometimes over several visits, before they were admitted to the hospital.

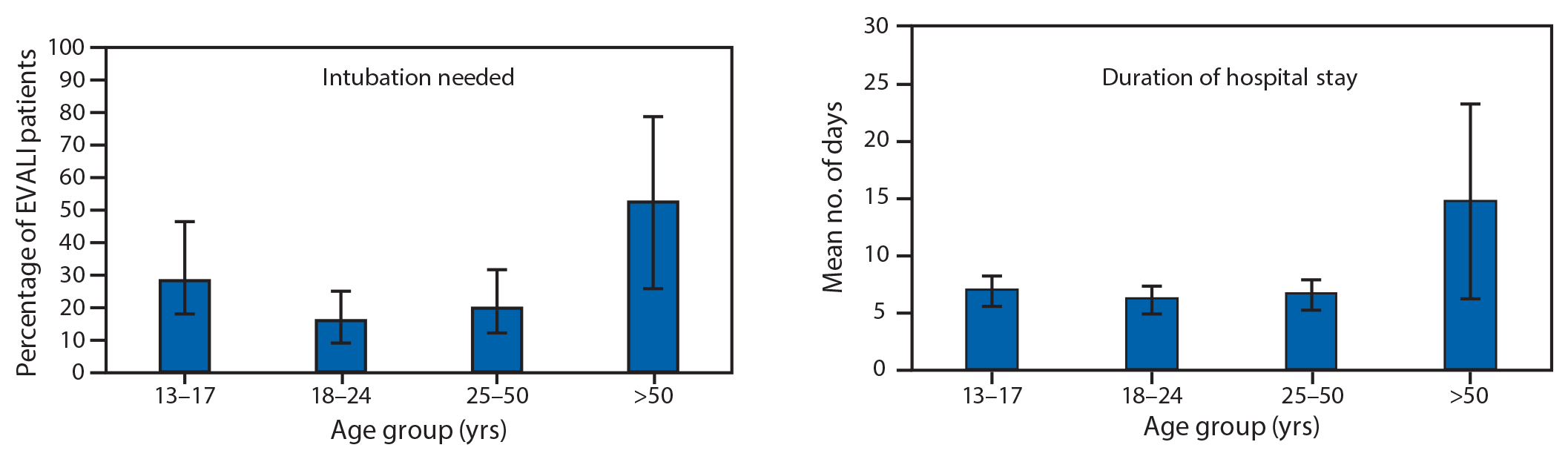
Percentage of persons needing intubation and hospitalization among persons with vaping-associated lung injury

Many patients have required medical treatment with supplemental oxygen, including some who required assisted ventilation. Some patients have been treated with corticosteroids with demonstrated improvement. Evidence does not suggest an infectious disease is the cause of the severe pulmonary disease. Antibiotic therapy alone has not consistently been associated with clinical improvement. A handful of individuals have been re-admitted for clinical care after discharge for lung injury. The CDC does not know whether individuals who were re-admitted continued or restarted use. The range of time that the CDC is aware of for these re-admissions ranges from approximately five days after discharge, to 55 days after discharge.

As of 5 September 2019, the New York State Department of Health reported 34 cases of severe lung illness in patients who were reportedly using different vaping products. Tests conducted by the Wadsworth Center found exceedingly high amounts of vitamin E acetate in most of the cannabis e-cigarette products. "At least one vape product containing vitamin E acetate has been linked to each patient who submitted a product for testing," the New York State Department of Health stated. None of the nicotine-based product samples contained vitamin E acetate.

In the reports from Illinois and Wisconsin, the onset of respiratory findings appeared to have occurred over several days to several weeks before hospitalization. As of 5 September 2019, the Illinois Department of Public Health reported 42 cases of lung illness, seven that were still being investigated, and one death. Severe lung illness among young adults and youth who used vaping products required hospitalization in 11 cases in Wisconsin, and others were being investigated in August 2019. Symptoms were difficulty breathing, tiredness, chest pain, cough, and reduced weight. Some required assistance to breathe.

=== Deaths ===
A total of 68 deaths linked to vaping products have been confirmed as of 18 February 2020 among 27 states and the District of Columbia. At least one death linked to a vaping product At least two deaths linked to a vaping product At least three deaths linked to a vaping product At least four deaths linked to a vaping product At least five deaths linked to a vaping product Hospitalizations but no confirmed deaths

As of 18 February 2020, there were a recorded number of 68 deaths. Many of these deaths have been linked to illegal (black market) cannabis vaping products, which have been confirmed in 27 states and the District of Columbia: Alabama, California (4), Connecticut, Delaware, District of Columbia, Florida, Georgia (3), Illinois (5), Indiana (4), Kansas (2), Louisiana, Massachusetts (3), Michigan, Minnesota (3), Mississippi, Missouri (2), Montana, Nebraska, New Jersey, New York (2), Oregon (2), Pennsylvania, Rhode Island, South Carolina, Tennessee (2), Texas, Utah, and Virginia. The median age of deceased persons was 51 years, and ranged from 15 to 75 years, as of 14 January 2020.

== Canada ==
On 18 September 2019, a case of severe lung illness associated with vaping in Canada was reported. A high school student in Ontario needed to be put on life support. The person had been vaping every day. His health improved and he was released from the hospital. This case has not been confirmed, as 27 September 2019. He vaped intensively, adding THC to his devices.

He initially showed symptoms aligning with bronchiolitis, but many patients that have vape-related illnesses in the United States have experienced damage to the pulmonary alveoli; this type of injury was not found. Instead, his case aligned more with an injury called popcorn lung, an ailment most commonly seen in factory workers of microwave popcorn plants more than 20 years ago.

On 27 September 2019, the first confirmed case of a vaping-related lung illness was announced in Canada. A Montreal resident in Quebec in their 50s was admitted to a hospital with breathing difficulties. The person had been vaping to help them give up smoking. Chief Public Health Officer of Canada announced on 11 October 2019, that they are aware of the initial cases of vaping-associated lung illness, and they stated that a few other occurrences are being investigated. Three probable cases have been reported in British Columbia as of 7 November 2019, and other cases are under investigation in British Columbia. Two probable cases have been reported in New Brunswick as of 16 October 2019.

A case in Newfoundland and Labrador was reported as a probable case of a lung illness tied to vaping in January 2020. A person became sick in late 2019 following the routine use of a cannabis product, and has since been released from the hospital. As of 4 February 2020, 17 cases of lung injuries have been reported to the Public Health Agency of Canada. Reported cases were from Alberta (1), British Columbia (3), New Brunswick (2), Newfoundland and Labrador (1), Ontario (4), and Quebec (6). 14 people required hospitalization.

== Other countries ==
What has occurred in the United States has not occurred in other places where vaping is frequent, such as the UK. In European countries such as France, there is no evidence of an outbreak of the vaping-associated lung illness that occurred in the US. The first case of EVALI in the Philippines was confirmed in November 2019.

== Investigation ==
11 October 2019 Centers for Disease Control and Prevention audio of the telebriefing conference call with reporters. An update into the cases of lung injury linked to vaping.

Sounding the Alarm: The Public Health Threats of E-Cigarettes

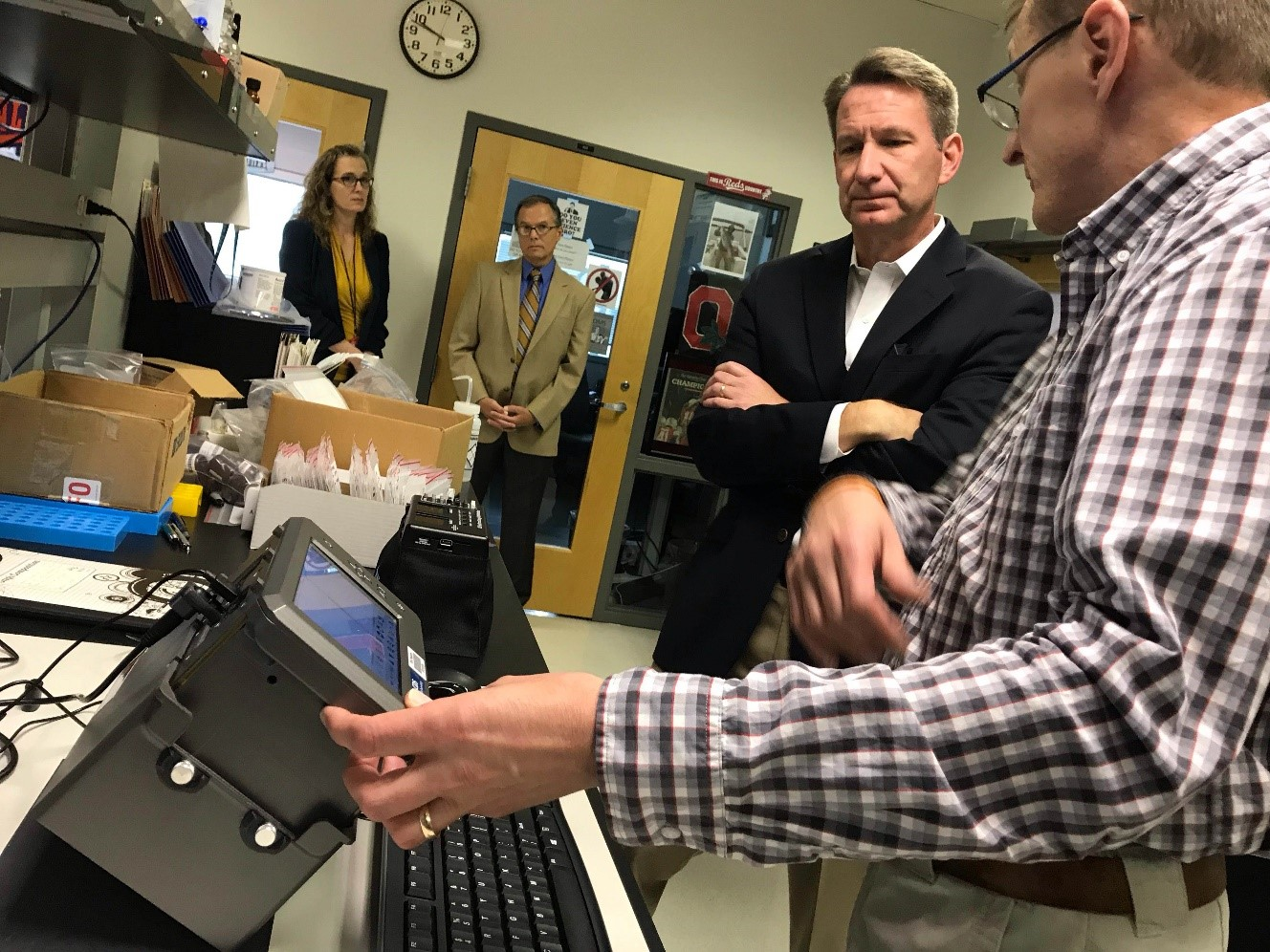
US FDA's Forensic Chemistry Center

Investigators from multiple states in the US are collaborating with the Centers for Disease Control and Prevention (CDC) and the US Food and Drug Administration (US FDA) to determine the cause of the lung illnesses associated with the use of vaping products.

On 6 September 2019, Dr. Dana Meaney-Delman, serving as the incident manager of CDC's response to this outbreak, said that "Based on the clinical and laboratory evidence to date, we believe that a chemical exposure is likely associated with these illnesses. However, and I really want to stress this, more information is needed to determine which specific products or substances are involved. We are aware that some laboratories have identified vitamin E acetate in product samples, and we have connected those laboratories with the FDA Forensic laboratories to compare results. At this time, no one device, product, or substance has been linked to all cases. Continued investigation is needed to better understand if a true relationship exists between any specific product or substance and the illnesses observed in patients. To find the answer we will need to combine information about e-cigarette use, and product sample testing and the clinical information from patients."

Many patients have acknowledged recent use of tetrahydrocannabinol (THC)-containing e-cigarette products while speaking to healthcare personnel, or in follow-up interviews by health department staff. On 6 September 2019, The New England Journal of Medicine reported that "Information on product use is based on reports by the patients, and patients may be reluctant to report illicit drug use." On 2 October 2019, The New England Journal of Medicine reported that the histologic evidence suggests that the "vaping-associated lung injury represents a form of airway-centered chemical pneumonitis from one or more inhaled toxic substances rather than exogenous lipoid pneumonia as such, but the agents responsible remain unknown." They also stated that this "finding should be interpreted with caution." On 17 October 2019, the American Journal of Clinical Pathology reported that lung biopsies from eight patients with vaping-associated lung injury show acute lung injury patterns, not exogenous lipoid pneumonia.

Of the 2,506 reported cases, information is available in the three months prior to symptom onset for 1,782 of them as of 3 December 2019. 80% reported THC use, 35% reported exclusive THC use, about 54% reported using nicotine-containing products, and 13% reported exclusive use of nicotine-containing products. The CDC reported that their findings suggest vaping products containing THC, particularly those obtained off the street or from other informal sources (e.g. friends, family members, or illicit dealers), are linked to most of the cases, and play a major role in the outbreak.

On 8 November 2019, Dr. Anne Schuchat, principal deputy director of the CDC, said, "for the first time we have detected a potential toxin of concern — Vitamin E acetate — in biologic samples from patients with lung injuries associated with the use of e-cigarette or vaping products." The sample types were bronchoalveolar lavage (BAL) fluid samples (fluid samples collected from the lungs). The chemical was found in samples collected from ten different states, from the lungs of 29 patients with the disease. "These findings provide direct evidence of Vitamin E acetate at the primary site of injury within the lungs," said Dr. Schuchat.

The CDC tested for a wide range of substances that might be found in e-cigarette or vaping products including plant oil, petroleum distillates like mineral oil, medium-chain triglyceride oils – or MCT oils – and terpenes which are compounds found in or added to THC products. No other potential toxicants were detected in the testing conducted so far. The CDC did not rule out other possible compounds or ingredients that may be causing the lung injuries. No one compound or ingredient has emerged as the cause of these illnesses so far; and it may be that there is more than one cause of this outbreak.

Many of the samples tested by the states or by the US FDA, as part of the 2019 investigation, have been identified as vaping products containing tetrahydrocannabinol (or THC, a psychoactive component of the cannabis plant) and further, most of those samples with THC tested also contained significant amounts of vitamin E acetate. Vitamin E acetate is a substance present in topical consumer products or dietary supplements, but data is limited about its effects after inhalation. While the US FDA does not have enough data presently to conclude that vitamin E acetate is the cause of the lung injury in these cases, the agency believes it is prudent to avoid inhaling this substance. The US FDA's Forensic Chemistry Center serves as the FDA's national laboratory, and is playing a critical role in fact-gathering and analysis for the incidents of lung illnesses following vaping product use.

A 2020 study found that vaporizing vitamin E acetate produced carcinogenic alkenes and benzene, but also exceptionally toxic ketene gas (also known as ethenone), which may be a contributing factor to the pulmonary injuries. Exposure to concentrated levels of ketene gas causes humans to experience irritation of body parts such as the eye, nose, throat and lungs. Extended toxicity testing on mice, rats, guinea pigs and rabbits showed that ten-minute exposures to concentrations of freshly generated ketene gas as low as 0.2 mg/liter (116 ppm) may produce a high percentage of deaths in small animals. These findings show ketene gas is toxicologically identical to phosgene.

== Illicit vaping ==
Frequently reported brand names of THC and nicotine-containing e-cigarette or vaping products reported by patients with lung injury — Illinois and Wisconsin, 2019

Inhalation of chemicals or substances is considered to be the main cause of the lung illnesses. Counterfeit cannabis cartridges are being sold to users at a reduced cost. Dank Vapes is an illicit brand that uses a cartridge. There is no singular company that owns Dank Vapes. Dank Vapes appears to be the most prominent in a class of largely counterfeit brands, with common packaging that is easily available online, and that is used by distributors to market THC-containing cartridges with no obvious centralized production or distribution. Some of the vaping products that contained exceedingly high amounts of vitamin E acetate include Chronic Carts and Dank Vapes.

Illicit vape brands have been sold across multiple states in the US. As of 27 August 2019, the most frequently used product reported by patients experiencing respiratory, gastrointestinal, and/or constitutional symptoms in Illinois and Wisconsin was the THC product called Dank Vapes. Dank Vapes was the most commonly reported product brand used by patients nationwide, although there are regional differences. While Dank Vapes was most commonly reported in the Northeast and South, TKO and Smart Cart brands were more commonly reported by patients in the West, and Rove was more common in the Midwest. The composition of THC based oils is, to a large extent, unknown.

== Public health recommendations ==
The CDC recommends that the public should consider not using any vaping products during their investigation, particularly those containing THC from informal sources like friends, or family, or in-person or online dealers as of 20 November 2019. The US FDA considers it prudent to avoid inhaling vitamin E acetate. On 6 September 2019, the US FDA stated that because consumers cannot be sure whether any THC vaping products may contain vitamin E acetate, consumers are urged to avoid buying vaping products on the street, and to refrain from using THC oil or modifying/adding any substances to products purchased in stores. The CDC recommends that e-cigarette, or vaping, products should never be used by youths, young adults, or women who are pregnant. Adults who do not currently use tobacco products should not start using e-cigarette, or vaping, products, according to the CDC.

Various diluent thickening products were sold online via wholesale suppliers. There has been an increase in attention to companies that sell diluent products that are made with vitamin E acetate. A lot of speculation has focused on Honey Cut. Honey Cut, used as a diluent thickener, became widely used in Los Angeles' vape pen manufacturing plants in late 2018. After Honey Cut became widely used in THC vape cartridges many other similar products from other companies were introduced into the market in early 2019.

The maker of Honey Cut's product is not known, and the only way to purchase the product was from the company's website. In early September 2019, the Honey Cut website went offline and Honey Cut told sellers in the Toy District, Los Angeles area to discontinue offering its products for sale. Counterfeit products from China that look like Honey Cut products were being sold, which increased the confusion in regard to which products people may have been vaping.

The company Floraplex in Michigan has shutdown the buyers page for their Uber Thick brand. The diluent products called Clear Cut were sold by Connoisseur Concentrates from Tigard, Oregon. Clear Cut is no longer available from the company's website. The company acknowledged the products contained vitamin E acetate. The company stated that it began selling the products in May 2019 and was reviewed by the Oregon Liquor Control Commission. As of 10 September 2019, Mass Terpenes' Pure Thickener diluent is no longer available on its website. A cache of the product on its website stated, "a proprietary formula composed simply of flavorless terpenes and a derivative of Vitamin E (to preserve color and consistency)."

Aaron Riley, CEO of CannaSafe, stated that likely about 75-80% of illicit vapes use some type of diluent agent. Drew Jones of Mr Extractor stated in September 2019 that as high as 70% of illicit cannabis vape cartridges in the US contain vitamin E acetate. It is estimated that at least 40 companies in the US sold a cutting agent containing vitamin E acetate. Thickening agents have been sold online as a less costly and safer substitute.

Thickening agents were used to water down and bulk up vape oils. Thickening agents were used mostly in THC vape products. Vitamin E acetate was used to cut THC oil to dilute it. Vitamin E acetate dilutes vape oil without making it look like the oil was watered down. Previously, vitamin E was used in low concentrations, or lower than 20% of the formula in vape cartridges. As a result of a limited availability of cannabis in California as well as high demand, illicit sellers had used about 50% or higher of diluent thickeners in their formulas to bulk up tiny potency vape cartridges. Thomas Whitten, a consultant at WeedRAR, said to Rolling Stone that "there's so much cutting agent even the people who made the cutting agent didn't expect it to be cut that much." Some cannabis laboratories began making arrangements in September 2019 to provide testing services for vitamin E.

Regulations in legal markets for cannabis use allow the use of many additives such as tocopherols (various forms of vitamin E). However, regulators may be considering banning such substances in the near future, as of September 2019. As of December 2019, Washington state has now banned vape products containing vitamin E acetate, thought to be linked to illness. Although the substance is not banned in the United States and has not been officially declared as a deadly substance, many states are making advances to ban the use of the chemical in vape products. States like Massachusetts are considering a ban on flavored tobacco and vape products, and in New York, Manhattan is expected to become the largest city to ban all vaping flavors except tobacco. Other states that have already banned the use of vitamin E acetate in vape products include Colorado and Ohio.

== Legal proceedings ==
=== Subpoenas ===
In September 2019, New York Governor Andrew Cuomo instructed the state health department to issue subpoenas against three sellers of thickening agents used in illicit vaping products. The subpoenas are being served against Honey Cut Labs in Santa Monica, California, for its Honey Cut product; Floraplex Terpenes in Ypsilanti, Michigan, for its Uber Thick product; and Mass Terpenes in Amherst, Massachusetts, for its product. All three firms sell a product used as a thickener in vape liquids. The thickeners from all three firms were found to contain mostly vitamin E acetate, according to test results from the Wadsworth Center.

=== Criminal cases ===
On 5 September 2019, Tyler Huffhines and Jacob Huffhines were arrested. Search warrants were served on a house at their place of residence and at a leased condominium. In September 2019, an investigation in Kenosha County, Wisconsin, is underway to determine whether a major operation ran by the Huffhines brothers for purportedly making illicit THC vape cartridges, which were packed in containers to resemble candy and were thought to have been marketed to youth, could be related to a series of vaping-induced lung illness and deaths in the US. The purportedly candy-themed containers used names such as Sour Patch. In January 2018, Tyler Huffhines purportedly began the operation. The vape cartridges purportedly contained as high as 1,000 milligrams of THC, when the packaging stated it was just 5 milligrams. Roughly $1.5 million worth of THC products were seized during the raid. 57 mason jars containing THC oil were also seized during the raid. Each jar was worth about $6,000.

An initial appearance in Kenosha County court was held for both brothers on 16 September 2019. Tyler Huffhines is facing multiple drug-related charges including possession with intent to deliver THC. Jacob Huffhines is facing charges including being a felon in possession of a firearm and possession of THC. Bond for Tyler Huffhines was set $500,000. Bond for Jacob Huffhines was set at $50,000. Both are scheduled to return to court on 26 September 2019. The Huffhines brothers pleaded not guilty on 23 October 2019.

Courtney Huffhines, the mother of Jacob and Tyler Huffhines, was charged with assisting her sons run the illegal THC vape operation. A woman was arrested in connection with the THC vape operation. On 3 October 2019, Hannah Curty was charged with making THC, as a party to an offense against the law. She is scheduled to return to court on 11 October 2019. Courtney Huffhines and Hannah Curty were in court on 11 October 2019. Both women are due to return to court on 23 October 2019. Courtney Huffhines and Hannah Curty pleaded not guilty on 23 October 2019.

On 17 October 2019, 22-year-old Jordan Lynam was charged with making THC vape cartridges in relation to the Huffhines's purportedly illicit vaping operation.

Daniel Graumenz, Wesley Webb, and Tarail King are facing charges in relation to the illicit vaping operation.

=== Civil lawsuits ===
On 23 September 2019, a product liability lawsuit, Charles Wilcoxson v. Canna Brand Solutions LLC et al., was filed in Superior Court of Pierce County, Washington, against makers of THC vape cartridges. Wilcoxson, a peace officer, had used THC vape products between January 2018 and September 2019. He bought cannabis products that included Conscious Cannabis, Rainbows Aloft, Leafwerx, MFused, and Jane's Garden, and a Canna Brand Solutions vaporizer, all of which were cited as defendants. The plaintiff was hospitalized for three days in September 2019 with wheezing and lipoid pneumonia as a result of his vaping, according to the complaint.

In September 2019, 35-year-old Erin Gilbert from Virgin Islands filed a lawsuit against Just CBD in a Broward County, Florida court, contending that her sickness was the result of a CBD vape oil containing mango flavor that she had purchased from a merchant in Saint Croix. After just a few days of using the vape oil, she had severe respiratory problems, multiple organ failure, and deficient supply of oxygen, resulting in necrosis of her legs, both of which had to be amputated.

In May 2019, a 21-year-old was hospitalized for more than two weeks due to fluid in his lungs and was in a medically induced coma for 8 days. He had purportedly developed an addiction to Juul mint pods, which he had been using since age 19. In October, the patient sued Juul, complaining the company did not disclose the dangers of its pod system and deceptively advertised its products as being safer than combustible cigarettes. The suit also claimed Juul aimed to intentionally entice underage individuals and young adults with their product, as well as individuals who had never been smokers in the firm place.

In September 2019, a lawsuit was brought on behalf of an 18-year-old from Illinois who had been hospitalized with lung damage from vaping. The plaintiff charged Juul with targeting teens with false marketing of a dangerous product, and a gas station for allowing him to buy vaping products as a minor.

On 29 October 2019, the Los Angeles Unified School District, the second largest district in the nation filed a class action suit against Juul for creating an epidemic of youth vaping that it alleged to impede student learning and endanger the health and safety of its students. By January 2020, a total of 10 California school districts had joined a lawsuit against Juul, seeking injunctive relief and abatement remedy to fight against the vaping epidemic in California school districts. On December 8, 2022, a global settlement was reached with Juul resolving claims brought by school districts, municipalities and county governments.

== Responses ==
=== E-cigarette industry ===
The e-cigarette industry is placing the blame on illicit vaping liquids for the lung injuries. "Each day of this crisis brings more evidence that street vapes containing THC or other illegal drugs are responsible for these illnesses, not nicotine vaping products," said Gregory Conley of the American Vaping Association, in August 2019. "Like any health-related events reportedly associated with the use of vapor products, we are monitoring these reports," Juul Labs stated to Reuters in August 2019. The company also stated that some news agencies report that several cases of lung illness are associated with vaping THC, found in cannabis, "a Schedule 1 controlled substance that we do not sell."

However recent research using commercially sourced JUUL nicotine vape products has documented harms from these devices. A February 2022 research article on vape aerosol from JUUL products showed "Profound pathological changes to upper airway, lung tissue architecture, and cellular structure," of mice exposed for as little as 9 weeks. "This vaping-induced pulmonary injury model demonstrates mechanistic underpinnings of vaping-related pathologic injury."

=== United States ===
The CDC recommends that people should not use e-cigarette, or vaping, products that contain THC, particularly from informal sources like friends, or family, or in-person or online dealers. Until the relationship of vitamin E acetate and lung health is better understood, vitamin E acetate should not be added to e-cigarette, or vaping, products. People should not add any substance to e-cigarette or vaping products that are not intended by the manufacturer, including products purchased through retail establishments. CDC recommends that people should not modify or add any substances such as vitamin E acetate to e-cigarette, or vaping, products that are not intended by the manufacturer, including products purchased through retail establishments. According to the CDC, if you are an adult using e-cigarettes, or vaping, products, to quit smoking, do not return to smoking cigarettes. Adults addicted to nicotine using e-cigarettes should weigh all risks and benefits, and consider utilizing FDA-approved nicotine replacement therapies.

The US FDA considers it prudent to avoid inhaling vitamin E acetate. On 6 September 2019, the US FDA stated that because consumers cannot be sure whether any THC vaping products may contain vitamin E acetate, consumers are urged to avoid buying vaping products on the street, and to refrain from using THC oil or modifying/adding any substances to products purchased in stores. On 4 October 2019, the US FDA strengthened its warning to consumers to stop using vaping products containing THC amid more than 1,000 reports of lung injuries—including some resulting in deaths—following the use of vaping products.

"The legal vapes have been actively regulated by FDA since Aug 2017. FDA has conducted thousands of inspections of manufacturers and vape stores, published manufacturing guidance, sought product removals etc. These tragedies point to illegal vapes and THC," former FDA Commissioner Scott Gottlieb tweeted in August 2019. During an interviewed on CNBC's Squawk Box on 9 September 2019, Gottlieb said that "the current belief is the illnesses are linked to illegal vapes containing vitamin E oil." He also stated that cannabis products in the US should be regulated.

"The e-cigarette-related lung illnesses currently sweeping across the country reaffirm our belief that the use of e-cigarettes and vaping is an urgent public health epidemic that must be addressed. We must not stand by while e-cigarettes continue to go unregulated. We urge the U.S. Food and Drug Administration (FDA) to speed up the regulation of e-cigarettes and remove all unregulated products from the market. We also call on the FDA to immediately ban flavors, as well as marketing practices, that enhance the appeal of e-cigarette products to youth," Patrice A. Harris, the president of the American Medical Association, stated on 9 September 2019. On 19 November 2019, the American Medical Association urged for a complete ban on all types of vaping products that are not approved by the US FDA as quitting smoking aids.

Various states have banned vitamin E acetate in vaping products, including Colorado, Ohio, and Washington.

The governor of Massachusetts declared a public health emergency on 24 September 2019, and ordered a 4-month moratorium on the sale of all vaping products, both for nicotine and THC. After courts determined it had sole jurisdiction over THC products, the Massachusetts Cannabis Control Commission quarantine all THC vape products until they could be screened for vitamin E acetate and other chemicals. A Massachusetts testing lab offering tests to consumers found vitamin E acetate was widespread in unlicensed products but not in licensed products. The nicotine vaping ban was also challenged and ended early, but prompted the state legislature to ban flavored nicotine products to reduce underage vaping, among other new measures.

The federal government has been criticized for instituting bans on flavored products rather than passing caps on nicotine concentrations and establishing accountability measures for negligent marketing.

=== Canada ===
Health Canada, the responsible government agency, responded to the US cases of potentially deadly lung illness by issuing a warning on 4 September 2019. They advise that Canadians consider not using vaping products, monitor for symptoms, get a medical attention quickly if they have concerns, tell their doctor if and what they vape or have vaped, avoid the illegal and unregulated markets, avoid modifying vaping products, report adverse reactions, and monitor their advisory for updates. They stated for those who are vaping to watch for symptoms such as cough, shortness of breath, or chest pain. On 11 October 2019, Chief Public Health Officer of Canada recommended to Canadians to consider holding back from vaping. Health Canada started a $766,000 advertisement campaign to curb underage vaping in part in response to the US and Canadian outbreak.

=== Europe ===
"What little we know of recent reports from the U.S. is that the devices used appear to be linked to 'home brews' of illicit drugs and not legitimate vaping products," Martin Dockrell, overseer of tobacco control at Public Health England, stated in September 2019.

=== Australia ===
As a result of a potential link between vaping and lung illness in the US, the Australian Medical Association stated on 18 September 2019, that they reiterate a precautionary approach for the use of vaping products.

=== India ===
Following a string of deaths tied to vaping in the US, India has enacted the Prohibition of Electronic Cigarettes (Production, Manufacture, Import, Export, Transport, Sale, Distribution, Storage and Advertisement) Act 2019.

=== World Health Organization ===
Dr. Vinayak Prasad, overseer of tobacco control at World Health Organization, told CNN on 12 September 2019, that WHO was observing the events in the US and abroad and will provide information to governments at the appropriate time. Prasad also stated that its member states have not made any announcements of lung illnesses that resemble those that were observed in the US.

== Hospitalized patients ==
News media featured hospitalized lung vaping illness patients in narratives including the following:

- Dehydration from nausea, multifocal pneumonia, sepsis, acute respiratory failure with hypoxemia, and blood clots, necessitating a medically induced coma and removal of fluid from the lungs.
- Vomiting, coughing up blood, and lipid pneumonia
- Nausea, chest pains, shortness of breath, and acute respiratory distress syndrome necessitating extracorporeal membrane oxygenation (ECMO)
- Shoulder and back pain, double lung collapse
- Vomiting, fever, sweating, painful coughing, bronchitis, and double pneumonia in a patient who had vaped THC
- Vomiting up food, oil and water in the lungs, requiring supplemental oxygen for daily activities
- Severe pain in the side, lung collapse, "black spots" on the lungs in a patient using about half a Juul mint pod a day for about 18 months.
- Chest and back pain from recurrent pneumothoraces (air in the chest outside of the lungs)
- Trouble breathing, necessitating a ventilator and medically induced coma. The 18-year-old patient says she bought vaping products from a smoke shop that did not ask for her ID card, enabling her to lie and claim that she was 22.
- Dizziness, vomiting, abdominal pain, difficulty breathing, necessitating supplemental oxygen.
- Breathing problems mistaken for the flu or stomach virus, eventually requiring ECMO
- Difficulty breathing, requiring supplemental oxygen and steroids, diagnosed as popcorn lung.
- Dizziness and vomiting, problems breathing diagnosed as pneumonitis
- Patient discovered unresponsive in bedroom, mucus and blood coming from lungs, cardiac arrest
- Double lung transplant for a 17-year-old from Michigan on 15 October 2019, believed to be the first such procedure due to vaping

== Criticism of vaping bans ==
Critics of vaping bans state that vaping is a much safer alternative to smoking tobacco products and that vaping bans incentivize people to return to smoking cigarettes. For example, critics cite the British Journal of Family Medicine in August 2015 which stated, "E-cigarettes are 95% safer than traditional smoking." San Francisco's chief economist, Ted Egan, when discussing the San Francisco vaping ban stated the city's ban on e-cigarette sales will increase smoking as vapers switch to combustible cigarettes. Critics of smoking bans stress the absurdity of criminalizing the sale of a safer alternative to tobacco while tobacco continues to be legal.

In 2022, after two years of review, the Food and Drug Administration (FDA) denied Juul's application to keep its tobacco and menthol flavored vaping products on the market. Critics of this denial note that research published in Nicotine and Tobacco Research found that smokers who transitioned to Juuls in North America were significantly more likely to switch to vaping than those in the United Kingdom who only had access to lower-strength nicotine products. This happened as the Biden administration was seeking to mandate low-nicotine cigarettes which, critics noted, is not what makes cigarettes dangerous. They note that vaping does not contain many of the components that make smoking dangerous such as the combustion process and certain chemicals that are present in cigarettes that are not present in vape products.

In 2022, Brian King, the head of the FDA's Center for Tobacco Products, stated, "We do know that e-cigarettes — as a general class — have markedly less risk than a combustible cigarette product." When asked by Reason whether the FDA is going to commit any resources to correct misperceptions about e-cigarettes, King responded with "I can't commit to any specific actions."

== See also ==
- Health effects of electronic cigarettes
- Jamaica ginger
- Juul
