= C29H46O3 =

The molecular formula C_{29}H_{46}O_{3} (molar mass: 442.674 g/mol, exact mass: 442.3447 u) may refer to:

- Nandrolone undecanoate
- Testosterone decanoate
