= Vaping-associated pulmonary injury =

Lung disease caused by as-yet-unknown types of vaping

- Other names: Vaping-associated lung injury, e-cigarette, or vaping, product use associated lung injury (EVALI)
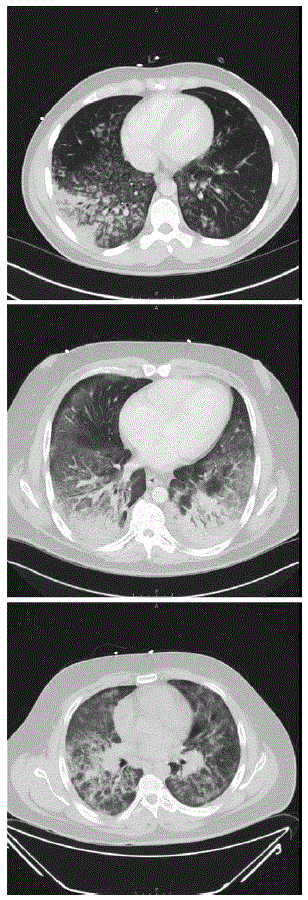
- CT scan of the chest showing diffuse lung infiltrates found in three cases of vaping-associated pulmonary injury
- Specialty: Pulmonology; intensive care medicine
- Symptoms: Shortness of breath; hypoxia; fever; cough; diarrhea
- Complications: Acute respiratory distress syndrome; respiratory failure
- Causes: Unclear, probably inhalation of vitamin E acetate from illicit vaping products
- Risk factors: History of vaping
- Diagnostic method: Chest X-ray; CT scan
- Differential diagnosis: Community-acquired pneumonia; COVID-19
- Treatment: Corticosteroids; oxygen therapy
- Frequency: 2,758 (US)
- Deaths: 68 (US)

Vaping-associated pulmonary injury (VAPI), also known as vaping-associated lung injury (VALI) or e-cigarette or vaping, product use associated lung injury (E/VALI), (Note: Also variously known as vaping-associated lung injury, vaping-induced lung injury, vaping-induced pulmonary disease, vaping-associated respiratory syndrome, vape-related lung disease, vape-related pulmonary illness, vaporizer-linked respiratory failure, vaping-linked lung illness, and vape lung) is an umbrella term used to describe severe and life-threatening lung diseases associated with the use of vaping products containing vitamin E acetate which had been used as a thickening agent by illicit THC vape cartridge manufacturers. Symptoms can initially mimic common pulmonary diagnoses, such as pneumonia, but sufferers typically do not respond to antibiotic therapy. Differential diagnoses have overlapping features with VAPI, including COVID-19. According to a systematic review article, "Initial case reports of vaping-related lung injury date back to 2012, but the ongoing outbreak of EVALI began in the summer of 2019." Many cases were initially misdiagnosed as COVID-19.

Sufferers usually present for care within a few days to weeks of symptom onset. Starting in September 2019, the US Centers for Disease Control and Prevention (CDC) reported on a nation-wide outbreak of severe lung disease linked to vaping, or the process of inhaling aerosolized substances with battery-operated electronic cigarettes (e-cigarettes), ciga-likes, or vape mods.

All CDC-reported cases of VAPI involved a history of using e-cigarette, or vaping, products, with most samples having tested positive for tetrahydrocannabinol (THC) by the US FDA and most patients reporting a history of using a THC-containing product. CDC data show that the outbreak peaked in September 2019, and declined steadily to a low level through January 2020. In late February 2020, a CDC-authored article in the NEJM stated that the VAPI outbreak was "driven by the use of THC-containing products from informal and illicit sources." However, the CDC also stated, "Evidence is not sufficient to rule out the contribution of other chemicals of concern, including chemicals in either THC or non-THC products, in some of the reported EVALI cases." In 2021, analysis of the aerosols from popular vape brands such as Juul and Vuse found "nearly 2,000 chemicals, the vast majority of which are unidentified."

The CDC has stated that the THC cutting agent vitamin E acetate is very strongly implicated in VAPI, but evidence was not sufficient to rule out a contribution from other chemicals of concern to VAPI as of January 2020.

== Prevention ==
To reduce the risk of EVALI public health agencies such as CDC have recommended several precautionary measures. Avoidance of e-cigarette or vaping products containing tetrahydrocannabinol (THC) has been emphasized, particularly those obtained from informal or unregulated sources, which have been strongly linked to EVALI cases.

Vitamin E acetate, an additive sometimes used in THC vaping liquids, has also been identified as a primary chemical of concern due to its association with lung injury.

Health authorities further advise that all vaping products should be purchased from licensed and reputable retailers to minimize the risk of contamination or mislabeling.

Educational campaigns targeting adolescents and parents have been implemented to raise awareness of the health risks associated with vaping, in an effort to reduce youth initiation.

In addition, public health experts have advocated for policy measures such as age restrictions and bans on flavored vaping products to help curb youth access and use.

== Signs and symptoms ==
Commonly reported symptoms include shortness of breath, cough, fatigue, body aches, dizziness, fever, nausea, vomiting, diarrhea, weight loss, chest pain, abdominal pain, and chills. Symptoms can initially mimic common pulmonary diagnoses like pneumonia, but individuals typically do not respond to antibiotic therapy. In some patients, gastrointestinal symptoms can precede respiratory symptoms. Individuals typically present for care within a few days to weeks of symptom onset.

At the time of hospital presentation, the individual is often hypoxic and meets systemic inflammatory response syndrome (SIRS) criteria, including fever. Physical exam can reveal rapid heart rate or rapid breathing. Auscultation of the lungs tends to be unremarkable, even in patients with severe lung disease. In some cases, the affected individuals have progressive respiratory failure, leading to intubation. Several affected individuals have needed to be placed in the intensive care unit (ICU) and on mechanical ventilation. Time to recovery for hospital discharge has ranged from days to weeks.

== Possible causes ==
No single cause of these illnesses has been established as of November 2019. Many different substances and product sources continued to be under investigation.

=== Composition of electronic cigarette aerosol ===
==== Chemicals ====
- Glycerin: One report suggests that glycerine derived from incompletely processed vegetable oil might be a cause of lipid pneumonia.
- MCT oil: In vivo mouse exposure of inhaled MCT oil induces acute pulmonary inflammation and toxicity.
- Vitamin E acetate: On September 5, 2019, the United States Food and Drug Administration (US FDA) announced that 10 out of 18, or 56% of the samples of vape liquids sent in by states, linked to recent vaping related lung disease outbreak in the United States, tested positive for vitamin E acetate which had been used as a thickening agent by illicit THC vape cartridge manufacturers. The CDC states that vitamin E acetate is a very strong culprit of concern in VAPI, having been found in 29 out of 29 lung biopsies tested from ten different states, but evidence is not yet sufficient to rule out contribution of other chemicals of concern to VAPI. The CDC stated as of 11 February 2020 that previous research suggested inhaled vitamin E acetate may interfere with normal lung functioning. A 2020 study found that vaped vitamin E acetate produced exceptionally toxic ketene gas, along with carcinogenic alkenes and benzene.
- Psychoactive substances:
  - CBD is one among the most suspected ingredients involved in VAPI. Conversion of CBD to THC can occur when CBD is heated to temperatures between 250–300 °C, potentially leading to its partial transformation into THC.
  - Synthetic cannabinoids: Can cause pneumonia via CB1 activation. Synthetic cannabinoids are increasingly offered in e-cigarette form as "c-liquid".
- Unknown chemicals
  - THC cartridges (not THC itself): An outbreak of lipid pneumonia occurred in North Carolina between July–August 2019

==== Pathogens ====
Products have been found to be contaminated with fungi and bacteria, which may cause fungal pneumonia, and bacterial pneumonia respectively.

Nicotine-containing e-liquids are extracted from tobacco that may contain impurities. Tobacco-specific impurities such as cotinine, nicotine-N'-oxides (cis and trans isomers), and beta-nornicotyrine are believed to be the result of bacterial action or oxidation during the extracting of nicotine from tobacco.

=== Heat ===
In addition to vaping, some individuals have also experienced VAPI through "dabbing". Dabbing uses a different type of device to heat and extract cannabinoids for inhalation. It is a process that entails superheating and inhaling particles into the lungs that contain THC and other types of cannabidiol plant materials.

== Mechanism ==
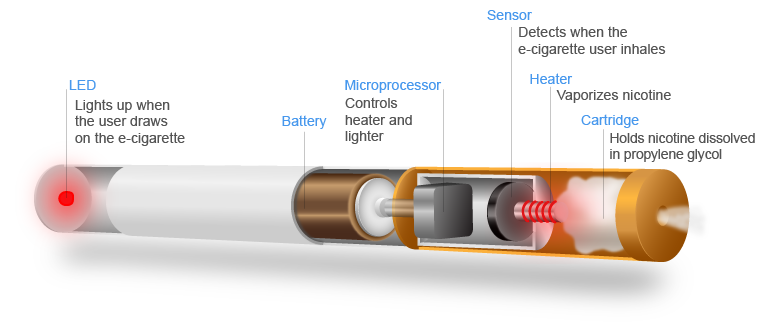
A schematic of a typical e-cigarette with a cartridge containing nicotine dissolved in propylene glycol

Vaping refers to the practice of inhaling an aerosol from an electronic cigarette device, which works by heating a liquid that can contain various substances, including nicotine, tetrahydrocannabinol (THC), flavoring, and additives (e.g. glycerin (sold as vegetable glycerine (VG)), propylene glycol (PG)). The long-term health impacts of vaping are unknown.

Most individuals treated for VAPI report vaping the cannabis compounds THC and/or cannabidiol (CBD), and some also report vaping nicotine products. A small but consistent minority of EVALI patients have been found not to be users of THC products.

VAPI appears to be a type of acute lung injury, similar to acute fibrinous pneumonitis, organizing pneumonia, or diffuse alveolar damage. VAPI appears to be a general term for various causes of acute lung damage due to vaping. There is no evidence of an infectious etiology causing VAPI.

== Diagnosis ==
High clinical suspicion is necessary to make the diagnosis of VAPI. As of October 2019, VAPI was considered a diagnosis of exclusion because no specific tests or markers existed for its diagnosis. Healthcare providers were advised to evaluate for alternative diagnoses (e.g., cardiac, gastrointestinal, rheumatologic, neoplastic, environmental, or occupational exposures, or causes of acute respiratory distress syndrome) as suggested by clinical presentation and medical history, while also considering multiple etiologies, including the possibility of VAPI occurring with a concomitant infection.

All healthcare providers evaluating patients for VAPI were urged to consider obtaining a thorough patient history, including symptoms and recent use of e-cigarette, or vaping, products, along with substances used, duration and frequency of use, and method of use. Additionally a detailed physical examination was recommended, specifically including vital signs and pulse-oximetry. Laboratory testing guided by clinical findings, which might include a respiratory virus panel to rule out infectious diseases, complete blood count with differential, serum inflammatory markers (C-reactive protein [CRP], erythrocyte sedimentation rate [ESR]), liver transaminases, and urine toxicology testing, including testing for THC were recommended.

Imaging, typically a chest X-ray, with consideration for a chest CT if chest X-ray results did not correlate with the clinical picture or to evaluate severe or worsening disease were urged. It was pointed out that consulting with specialists (e.g. critical care, pulmonology, medical toxicology, or infectious disease) could help guide further evaluation. The diagnosis is commonly suspected when the person does not respond to antibiotic therapy, and testing does not reveal an alternative diagnosis. Many of the reported cases involved worsening respiratory failure within 48 hours of admission, following the administration of empiric antibiotic therapy. Lung biopsies are not necessary for the diagnosis but are performed as clinically indicated to rule out the likelihood of infection.

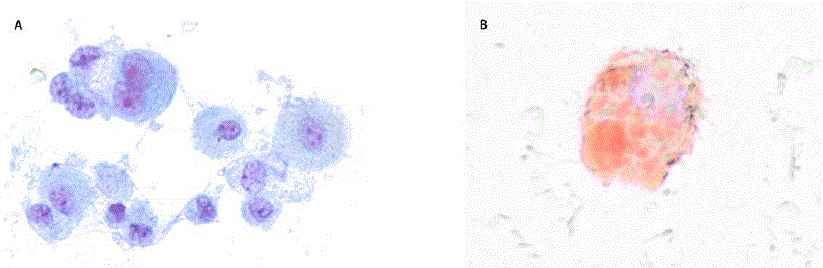
Bronchoalveolar lavage sample from a patient with acute lung injury associated with vaping, showing alveolar macrophages laden with vacuoles (A) and extensive lipid deposits (B)

There are non-specific laboratory abnormalities that have been reported in association with the disease, including elevations in white blood cell count (with neutrophilic predominance and absence of eosinophilia), transaminases, procalcitonin, and inflammatory markers. Infectious disease testing, including blood and sputum cultures and tests for influenza, Mycoplasma, and Legionella were all found to be negative in the majority of reported cases. Imaging abnormalities are typically bilateral and are usually described as "pulmonary infiltrates or opacities" on chest X-ray and "ground-glass opacities" on chest CT.

Bronchoalveolar lavage specimens may exhibit an increased level of neutrophils in combination with lymphocytes and vacuole-laden macrophages. Lavage cytology with oil red O staining demonstrated extensive lipid-laden alveolar macrophages. In the few cases in which lung biopsies were performed, the results were consistent with acute lung injury and included a broad range of features, such as acute fibrinous pneumonitis, diffuse alveolar damage, lipid-laden macrophages, and organizing pneumonia. Lung biopsies often showed neutrophil predominance as well, with rare eosinophils.

=== Case definitions ===
Based on the clinical characteristics of VAPI cases from ongoing federal and state investigations, interim surveillance case definitions for confirmed and probable cases have been developed.

The CDC surveillance case definition for confirmed cases of severe pulmonary disease associated with e-cigarette use:

- Using an e-cigarette ("vaping") or dabbing during the 90 days before symptom onset AND
- Pulmonary infiltrate, such as opacities on plain film chest radiograph or ground-glass opacities on chest computed tomography AND
- Absence of pulmonary infection on initial work-up. Minimum criteria include:
  - A negative respiratory viral panel
  - A negative influenza polymerase chain reaction or rapid test if local epidemiology supports testing.
  - All other clinically indicated respiratory infectious disease testing (e.g., urine antigen for Streptococcus pneumoniae and Legionella, sputum culture if productive cough, bronchoalveolar lavage culture if done, blood culture, human immunodeficiency virus–related opportunistic respiratory infections if appropriate) must be negative and
- No evidence in medical record of alternative plausible diagnoses (e.g., cardiac, rheumatologic, or neoplastic process).

The CDC surveillance case definition for probable cases of severe pulmonary disease associated with e-cigarette use:

- Using an e-cigarette ("vaping") or dabbing in 90 days before symptom onset AND
- Pulmonary infiltrate, such as opacities on plain film chest radiograph or ground-glass opacities on chest computed tomography AND
- Infection identified via culture or polymerase chain reaction, but clinical team believes this is not the sole cause of the underlying respiratory disease process OR minimum criteria to rule out pulmonary infection not met (testing not performed) and clinical team believes this is not the sole cause of the underlying respiratory disease process and
- No evidence in medical record of alternative plausible diagnoses (e.g., cardiac, rheumatologic, or neoplastic process).

These surveillance case definitions are meant for public health data collection purposes and are not intended to be used as a clinical diagnostic tool or to guide clinical care; they are subject to change and will be updated as additional information becomes available.

=== Differential diagnosis ===
As VAPI was, as of October 2019, a diagnosis of exclusion, a variety of respiratory diseases must be ruled out before a diagnosis of VAPI can be made. The differential diagnosis should include more common diagnostic possibilities, such as community-acquired pneumonia, as well as do-not-miss diagnoses, such as pulmonary embolism. Other commonly documented hospital diagnoses for cases of severe pulmonary disease associated with e-cigarette use have included acute respiratory distress syndrome (ARDS), sepsis, acute hypoxic respiratory failure, and pneumonitis.

As of September 2019, distinctions were still being made between processes occurring in association with vaping or the use of nicotine-containing liquids and those considered as alternative diagnoses to VAPI. These processes include the following:

- Acute eosinophilic pneumonia
- COVID-19
- Diffuse alveolar hemorrhage
- Giant cell pneumonitis
- Hypersensitivity pneumonitis
- Lipoid pneumonia
- Organizing pneumonia
- Respiratory bronchiolitis interstitial lung disease

The use of imaging and other diagnostic modalities, including chest CT, bronchoscopy with bronchoalveolar lavage, and lung biopsy, may provide additional information to determine the presence of these processes and potentially establish a definitive diagnosis, but are generally not performed unless clinically indicated.

== Treatment ==
As of October 18, 2019, the CDC has published updated interim guidance based on the most current data to provide a framework for healthcare providers in their management and follow-up of persons with symptoms of VAPI. Initial management involves deciding whether to admit a patient with possible VAPI to the hospital. Currently, the CDC recommends that patients with suspected VAPI should be admitted if they have decreased O_{2} saturation (<95%) on room air, are in respiratory distress, or have comorbidities that compromise pulmonary reserve.

Once admitted, initiation of corticosteroids should be considered, which have been found to be helpful in treating this injury. Several case reports describe improvement with corticosteroids, likely because of a blunting of the inflammatory response. In a group of patients in Illinois and Wisconsin, 92% of 50 patients received corticosteroids, and those that began glucocorticoid therapy continued on it for at least seven days.

The medical team documented in 65% of 46 patient notes that "respiratory improvement was due to the use of glucocorticoids". Among 140 cases reported nationally to the CDC that received corticosteroids, 82% of patients improved. In patients with more severe illness, a more aggressive empiric therapy with corticosteroids as well as antimicrobial and antiviral therapy may be warranted.

As a large proportion of patients were admitted to an intensive care unit based on data submitted to the CDC, many patients require supplemental oxygen via nasal cannula, high-flow oxygen, bilevel positive airway pressure (BiPAP), or mechanical ventilation.

During influenza season, health care providers should consider influenza in all patients with suspected VAPI. Decisions on initiation or discontinuation of treatment should be based on specific clinical features and, when appropriate, in consultation with specialists.

Special consideration should be given to high-risk patients such as the elderly, those with a history of cardiac or lung disease, or pregnant individuals. Patients over 50 years old have an increased risk of intubation and might need longer hospitalizations. CDC says patients should be advised to discontinue the use of vaping products upon hospital admission and during outpatient follow-up, to speed recovery and avoid potential recurrence of symptoms or lung injury. Evidence-based tobacco product quitting strategies include behavioral counseling and U.S. Food and Drug Administration (US FDA)-approved cessation medications.

=== Follow-up care ===
Due to reports of relapse during corticosteroid tapers after hospitalization, the CDC recommends scheduling a follow-up visit no later than one to two weeks after discharge from inpatient hospital treatment for VAPI, with considerations for performing pulse-oximetry testing and repeat CXR. In one to two months, healthcare providers should consider additional follow-up testing, including spirometry, diffusion capacity testing, and another repeat CXR. In patients with persistent hypoxemia (O_{2} saturation <95%) requiring home oxygen at discharge, consider ongoing pulmonary follow-up. In patients treated with high-dose corticosteroids, consider endocrinology follow-up to monitor adrenal function.

As it is unknown whether patients with a history of VAPI are at increased risk for severe complications with influenza or other respiratory infections, follow-up care should also include annual vaccination against influenza for all persons over 6 months of age, including patients with a history of VAPI, as well as administration of the pneumococcal vaccine according to current guidelines.

An important part of both inpatient and follow-up care for VAPI involves advising patients to discontinue use of e-cigarette or vaping products.

=== Public health recommendations ===
The CDC and the FDA recommend that people not use e-cigarettes or other vaping products that contain THC, particularly products purchased off the street or obtained from informal sources like friends, family, or online sellers. In addition, CDC recommends that individuals not modify or add any substances to e-cigarettes or other vaping products that are not intended by the manufacturer.

Avoiding e-cigarettes entirely avoids the risk of VAPI as well as other negative health consequences of vaping, but some health advocates promote e-cigarettes for certain populations as a means to help smokers of conventional cigarettes to quit. Research into the effectiveness of this approach is still incomplete.

== Epidemiology ==
The outbreak of vaping-related lung injuries in 2019 and 2020 mainly affected young people, primarily in the United States. As of February 4, 2020, there have been 2,758 cases of VAPI reported from all 50 states, the District of Columbia, Puerto Rico, and the US Virgin Islands. The CDC has received complete gender and age data on these cases with 70% of cases being male. The median age of cases is 24 years and ranges from 13 to 85 years. 79% of cases are under 35 years old. There have been 64 confirmed deaths in 28 states and the District of Columbia from this outbreak ranging from ages 15–75 years old.

Of the 2,051 cases reported to the CDC, information on substance use is known for 867 cases in the three months prior to symptom onset as of October 15, 2019. About 86% reported using THC-containing products; 34% reported exclusive use of THC-containing products. About 64% reported using nicotine-containing products; 11% reported exclusive use of nicotine-containing products.

On September 28, 2019, the first case of vaping-associated pulmonary injury was identified in Canada. A number of other probable cases have been reported in British Columbia and New Brunswick as of October 2019.

In September 2019, a US Insurance Journal article stated that at least 15 incidents of vaping related illnesses have been reported worldwide prior to 2019, occurring from Guam to Japan to the UK to the US. 12 cases of health problems with nicotine-containing e-cigarettes were reported to the UK's Medicines and Healthcare products Regulatory Agency (MHRA), with at least one case bearing high similarities to the lipid pneumonia cases reported in the US. One lipoid pneumonia-related death in the UK was associated with e-cigarettes in 2010.

Medical officials in continental Europe have reported two cases serious medical problems related to vaping products, one early case related to e-cigarettes documented in Northern Spain in 2015 and a second in Belgium in 2019. Since many of the cases in North America were traced to THC cartridges as well as the use of e-cigarette vape products, but THC remains illegal in European countries, the disease burden related to vaping has been significantly lower in Europe despite the prevalence of e-cigarette use.

Before the outbreak, one lipoid pneumonia-related death in the UK was associated with e-cigarettes in 2010.

18-year-old Raphaël Pauwaert from Brussels died on November 6, 2019, after developing pneumonia and being placed in a medically induced coma because he was unable to breathe on his own. He received an e-cigarette as a gift for his 18th birthday. His doctor stated Pauwaert's fatal lung infection probably resulted from the CBD vapor. This was considered the first death tied to vaping in Belgium. Pauwaert's CBD oils were tested for vitamin E at the Saint-Luc Hospital in November 2019. "Vitamin E (alpha tocopherol) and vitamin E acetate were not detected in the vaping fluid by ultraperformance liquid chromatography coupled with UV detection." The death is under investigation by the Brussels Public Prosecutor's Office. A friend of Pauwaert's was also hospitalized with the identical symptoms after using the same type of e-cigarette, but he survived.

The first case of a vaping-related lung illness in the Philippines was reported in November 2019. A 16-year-old girl from central Philippines was vaping e-cigarettes for half a year. She had difficulty breathing and was admitted to the hospital in October 2019. She was discharged after she received treatment from a pediatric pulmonologist.
