= Estradiol dibutyrate/hydroxyprogesterone heptanoate/testosterone caproate =

Combination drug

EDBu/OHPH/TCa
Combination of
- Estradiol dibutyrate: Estrogen
- Hydroxyprogesterone heptanoate: Progestogen
- Testosterone cyclohexylpropionate: Androgen; Anabolic steroid

Clinical data
- Trade names: Triormon Depositum
- Other names: EDBu/OHPH/TCa
- Routes of administration: Intramuscular injection

Estradiol dibutyrate/hydroxyprogesterone heptanoate/testosterone caproate (EDBu/OHPH/TCa), sold under the brand name Triormon Depositum, is an injectable combination medication of estradiol dibutyrate (EDBu), an estrogen, hydroxyprogesterone heptanoate (OHPH), a progestogen, and testosterone caproate (TCa), an androgen/anabolic steroid, which was used in the treatment of menopausal symptoms in women. It contained 3 mg EDBu, 30 mg OHPH, and 50 mg TCa in oil solution and was administered by intramuscular injection. The medication was developed by 1957. It is no longer available.

== See also ==
- List of combined sex-hormonal preparations § Estrogens, progestogens, and androgens
