= Liquid paraffin =

Liquid paraffin may refer to:

- Liquid paraffin (drug)
- Mineral oil
- In chemistry, a mixture of heavier alkanes
