= Estrapronicate =

Chemical compound

Clinical data
- Other names: Estradiol propionicotinate; Estradiol propionate nicotinate; Estradiol nicotinate propionate; Estradiol 17β-nicotinate 3-propionate
- Routes of administration: Intramuscular injection
- Drug class: Estrogen; Estrogen ester

Identifiers
- IUPAC name: [(8R,9S,13S,14S,17S)-13-Methyl-3-propanoyloxy-6,7,8,9,11,12,14,15,16,17-decahydrocyclopenta[a]phenanthren-17-yl] pyridine-3-carboxylate
- CAS Number: 4140-20-9
- PubChem CID: 66433
- ChemSpider: 59806
- UNII: BC621AC03L
- CompTox Dashboard (EPA): DTXSID70961659
- ECHA InfoCard: 100.021.786

Chemical and physical data
- Formula: C_{27}H_{31}NO_{4}
- Molar mass: 433.548 g·mol^{−1}
- 3D model (JSmol): Interactive image
- SMILES: CCC(=O)OC1=CC2=C(C=C1)C3CCC4(C(C3CC2)CCC4OC(=O)C5=CN=CC=C5)C
- InChI: InChI=1S/C27H31NO4/c1-3-25(29)31-19-7-9-20-17(15-19)6-8-22-21(20)12-13-27(2)23(22)10-11-24(27)32-26(30)18-5-4-14-28-16-18/h4-5,7,9,14-16,21-24H,3,6,8,10-13H2,1-2H3/t21-,22-,23+,24+,27+/m1/s1; Key:FXMSQUVSUXBBAB-TXDQRGGKSA-N

Estrapronicate (INN), also known as estradiol nicotinate propionate, is an estrogen medication and estrogen ester which was never marketed. It was studied as a component of the experimental tristeroid combination drug Trophobolene, which contained nandrolone decanoate, estrapronicate, and hydroxyprogesterone heptanoate.

== See also ==
- List of estrogen esters § Estradiol esters
- Estrapronicate/hydroxyprogesterone heptanoate/nandrolone undecanoate
