= Oxogestone =

Chemical compound

Clinical data
- Other names: Oxagestone; Oxagesterone; Oxogesterone; 20β-Hydroxy-19-norprogesterone; (20R)-20-Hydroxy-19-norpregn-4-en-3-one

Identifiers
- IUPAC name: (8R,9S,10R,13S,14S,17S)-17-[(1R)-1-hydroxyethyl]-13-methyl-2,6,7,8,9,10,11,12,14,15,16,17-dodecahydro-1H-cyclopenta[a]phenanthren-3-one
- CAS Number: 3643-00-3
- PubChem CID: 19275
- ChemSpider: 18186
- UNII: A98264FU0C
- CompTox Dashboard (EPA): DTXSID70189952

Chemical and physical data
- Formula: C_{20}H_{30}O_{2}
- Molar mass: 302.458 g·mol^{−1}
- 3D model (JSmol): Interactive image
- SMILES: CC(C1CCC2C1(CCC3C2CCC4=CC(=O)CCC34)C)O
- InChI: InChI=1S/C20H30O2/c1-12(21)18-7-8-19-17-5-3-13-11-14(22)4-6-15(13)16(17)9-10-20(18,19)2/h11-12,15-19,21H,3-10H2,1-2H3/t12-,15+,16-,17-,18-,19+,20-/m1/s1; Key:CNOGNHFPIBORED-JIKCGYBYSA-N

Oxogestone (INN), also known as 20β-hydroxy-19-norprogesterone, is a progestin of the 19-norprogesterone group which was synthesized in 1953 and was developed as an injectable hormonal contraceptive in the early 1970s but was never marketed. A C20β phenylpropionate derivative, oxogestone phenpropionate, also exists.
