= Estradiol dibutyrate =

Chemical compound

Clinical data
- Other names: EDBu; Estradiol dibutanoate; Estradiol 3,17β-dibutanoate
- Routes of administration: Intramuscular injection
- Drug class: Estrogen; Estrogen ester

Identifiers
- CAS Number: 63042-23-9
- ChemSpider: 4956817
- UNII: VQZ6UH9WLR
- CompTox Dashboard (EPA): DTXSID50978982
- ECHA InfoCard: 100.057.990

Chemical and physical data
- Formula: C_{26}H_{36}O_{4}
- Molar mass: 412.570 g·mol^{−1}
- 3D model (JSmol): Interactive image
- SMILES: O(C(CCC)=O)[C@]1CC[C@]([H])2[C@@]([H])3CCC4C=C(C=CC=4[C@@]3([H])CC[C@@]21C)OC(=O)CCC
- InChI: InChI=1S/C26H35O4/c1-4-6-24(27)29-18-9-11-19-17(16-18)8-10-21-20(19)14-15-26(3)22(21)12-13-23(26)30-25(28)7-5-2/h9,11,16,20-22H,4-8,10,12-15H2,1-3H3/t20-,21-,22+,26+/m1/s1; Key:YQLMZRSLVHCBEL-CQAGSAPUSA-N

Estradiol dibutyrate (EDBu), or estradiol dibutanoate, is an estrogen medication and an estrogen ester – specifically, a diester of estradiol – which is no longer used. It was a component of Triormon Depositum, a combination formulation of estradiol dibutyrate, testosterone caproate, and hydroxyprogesterone heptanoate which was developed in the 1950s.

== See also ==
- List of estrogen esters § Estradiol esters
- Estradiol dibutyrate/hydroxyprogesterone heptanoate/testosterone caproate
