= Lipid-laden alveolar macrophage =

Pathological cells in lung

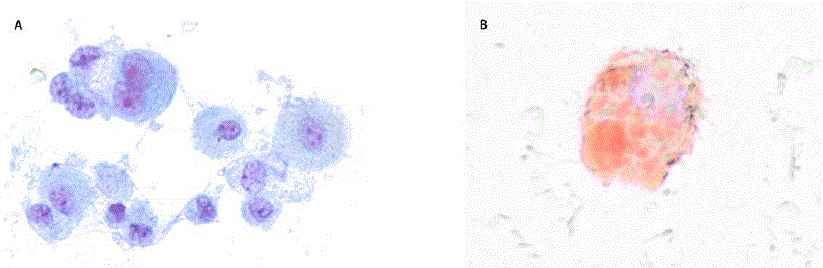
Lipid-laden alveolar macrophages in a case of vaping-associated pulmonary injury. Left: Papanicolaou stain; right: Oil Red O stain.

Lipid-laden alveolar macrophages, also known as pulmonary foam cells, are cells found in bronchoalveolar lavage (BAL) specimens that consist of macrophages containing deposits of lipids (fats). The lipid content of the macrophages can be demonstrated using a lipid targeting stain like Oil Red O or Nile red. Increased levels of lipid-laden alveolar macrophages are associated with various respiratory conditions, including chronic smoking, gastroesophageal reflux, lipoid pneumonia, fat embolism, pulmonary alveolar proteinosis and pulmonary aspiration. Lipid-laden alveolar macrophages have been reported in cases of vaping-associated pulmonary injury.

The lipid-laden macrophage index (LLMI) can be calculated by counting 100 macrophages in a BAL specimen treated with a lipid stain and scoring each macrophage from 0 to 4 based on the amount of lipids present in the cell. A LLMI score greater than 100 is considered positive for pulmonary aspiration. However, the test is limited by poor reproducibility and low specificity for pulmonary aspiration, as lipid-laden macrophages occur in many respiratory conditions.

== See also ==
- Foam cell
