= Liquid paraffin (drug) =

Mineral oil used in cosmetics and medicine

Paraffinum liquidum
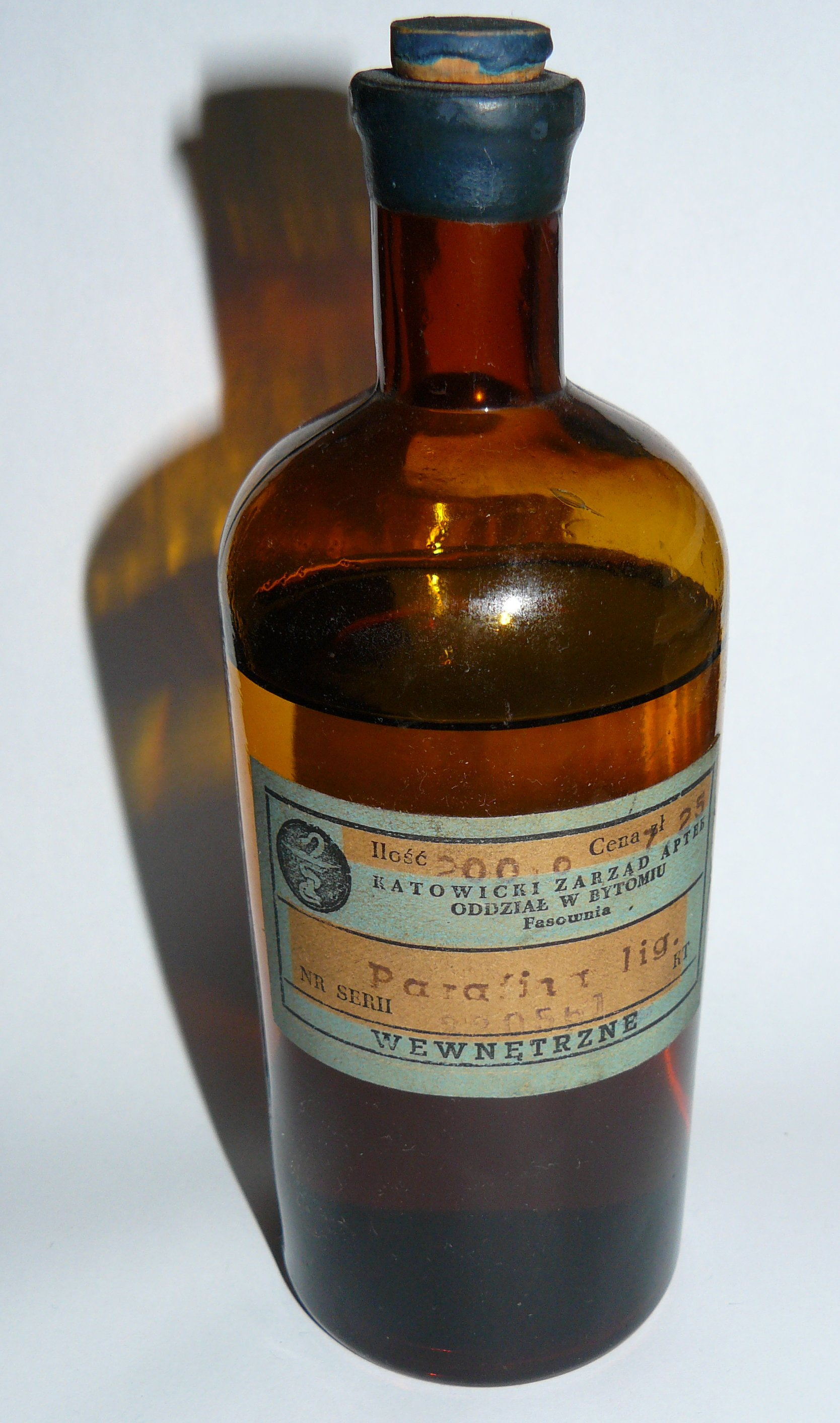
- Liquid paraffin in a bottle

Clinical data
- Routes of administration: Topical, oral
- ATC code: A06AA01 (WHO)

Legal status
- Legal status: In general: Over-the-counter (OTC)

Identifiers
- CAS Number: 8012-95-1
- PubChem SID: 7979779
- ChemSpider: none
- UNII: N6K5787QVP
- CompTox Dashboard (EPA): DTXSID3034743
- ECHA InfoCard: 100.029.437

Chemical and physical data
- Formula: C_{n}H_{2n+2}

Liquid paraffin, also known as paraffinum liquidum, paraffin oil, liquid paraffin oil or Russian mineral oil, is a very highly refined mineral oil used in cosmetics and medicine. Cosmetic or medicinal liquid paraffin should not be confused with the paraffin (i.e. kerosene) used as a fuel.

The generic sense of paraffin meaning alkane led to regional differences for the meanings of both paraffin and paraffin oil. It is a transparent, colorless, nearly odorless, and oily liquid that is composed of saturated hydrocarbons derived from petroleum.

The term paraffinum perliquidum is sometimes used to denote light liquid paraffin, while the term paraffinum subliquidum is sometimes used to denote a thicker mineral oil.

== History ==
Petroleum is said to have been used as a medicine since 400 BC, and has been mentioned in the texts of classical writers Herodotus, Plutarch, Dioscorides, Pliny, and others. It was used extensively by early Arabians and was important in early Indian medicine. Its first use internally is attributed to Robert A. Chesebrough, who patented it in 1872 for the manufacture of a "new and useful product from petroleum." After Sir W. Arbuthnot Lane, who was then Chief Surgeon of Guy's Hospital, recommended it as a treatment for intestinal stasis and chronic constipation in 1913, liquid paraffin gained more popularity.

== Usage in medicine ==
Liquid paraffin is primarily used as a pediatric laxative in medicine and is a popular treatment for constipation and encopresis. Because of its ease of titration, the drug is convenient to synthesize. It acts primarily as a stool lubricant, and is thus not associated with abdominal cramps, diarrhea, flatulence, disturbances in electrolytes, or tolerance over long periods of usage, side effects that osmotic and stimulant laxatives often engender (however, some literature suggests that these may still occur). The drug acts by softening the feces and coats the intestine with an oily film. Because of this it reduces the pain caused by certain conditions such as piles (haemorrhoids). These traits make the drug ideal for chronic childhood constipation and encopresis, when large doses or long-term usage is necessary.

Consensus has not been entirely reached on the safety of the drug for children. While the drug is widely accepted for the management of childhood constipation in North America and Australia, the drug is used much less in the United Kingdom. The drug is endorsed by the American Academy of Pediatrics and the North American Society for Gastroenterology and Nutrition, with the latter organization outlining it as a first choice for the management of pediatric constipation. The drug is suggested to never be used in cases in which the patient is neurologically impaired or has a potential swallowing dysfunction due to potential respiration complications. Lipoid pneumonia due to mineral oil aspiration is thus a recognized severe complication of this medication, and there is a need for a heightened awareness among caregivers about the potential dangers of inappropriate mineral oil use. Some go as far as saying that it should never be used with children due to this risk.

Liquid paraffin is also used in combination with magnesium as an osmotic laxative, sold under the trade name Mil-Par (among others).

Additionally, it may be used as a release agent, binder, or lubricant on capsules and tablets.

== Usage in cosmetics ==
Liquid paraffin is a hydrating and cleansing agent. Hence, it is used in several cosmetics both for skin and hair products. It is also used as one of the ingredients of after wax wipes.

== Health ==
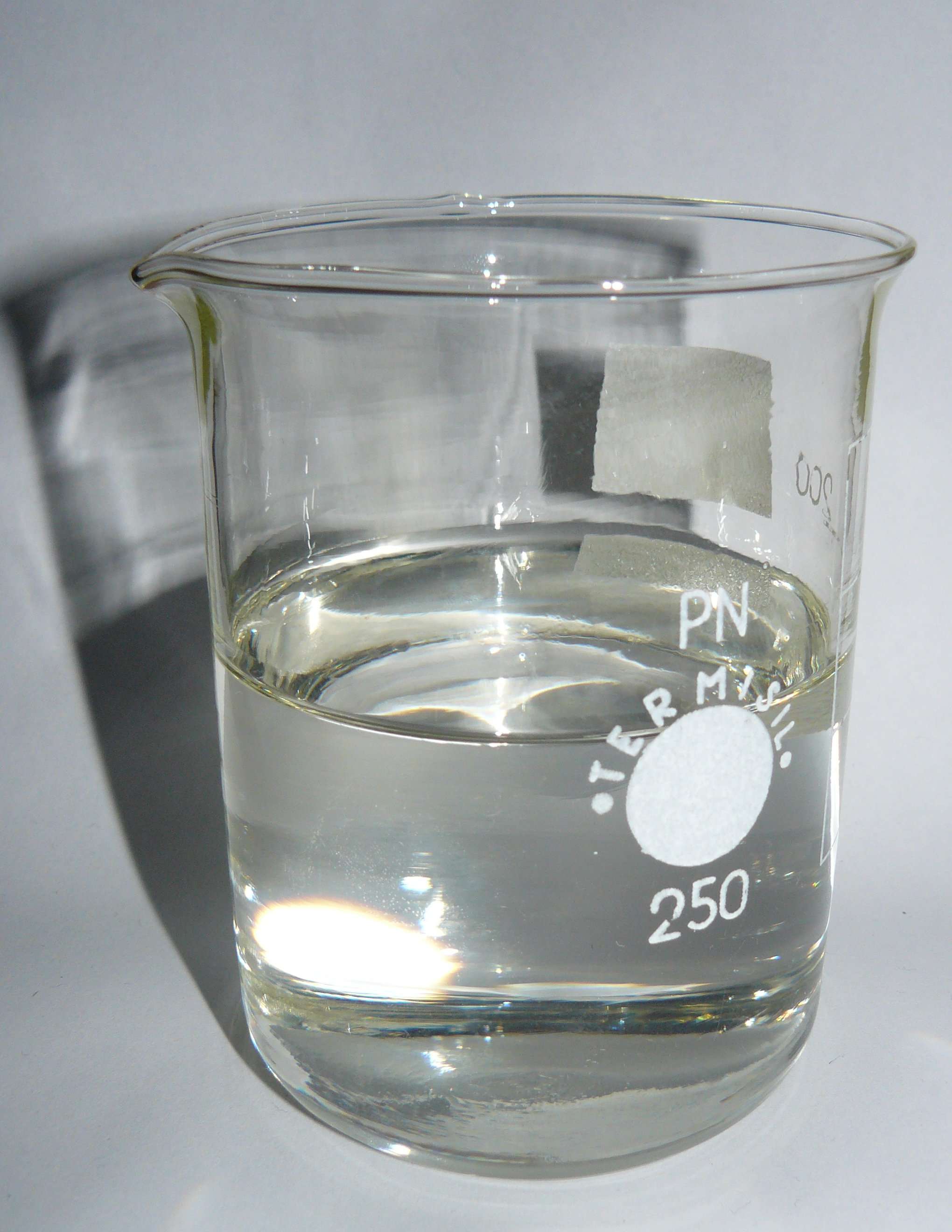
Paraffin in beaker

Upon being taken orally, liquid paraffin might interfere with the absorption of fat-soluble vitamins, though evidence does not seem to fully support this. It can be absorbed into the intestinal wall and may cause foreign-body granulomatous reactions in some rat species. These reactions might not occur in humans, however. Some evidence suggests that it does not engender carcinogenicity. If liquid paraffin enters the lungs, it can cause lipoid pneumonia.

If injected, it can cause granulomatous reactions.

== See also ==
- Mineral oil
- Petroleum jelly
