= Estradiol diundecylate/hydroxyprogesterone heptanoate/testosterone cyclohexylpropionate =

Combination drug

EDU/OHPH/TCHP
Combination of
- Estradiol diundecylate: Estrogen
- Hydroxyprogesterone heptanoate: Progestogen
- Testosterone cyclohexylpropionate: Androgen; Anabolic steroid

Clinical data
- Trade names: Trioestrine Retard
- Other names: EDU/OHPH/TCHP
- Routes of administration: Intramuscular injection

Estradiol diundecylate/hydroxyprogesterone heptanoate/testosterone cyclohexylpropionate (EDU/OHPH/TCHP), sold under the brand name Trioestrine Retard, is an injectable combination medication of estradiol diundecylate (EDU), an estrogen, hydroxyprogesterone heptanoate (OHPH), a progestogen, and testosterone cyclohexylpropionate (TCHP), an androgen/anabolic steroid. It contained 2.25 mg EDU, 100 mg OHPH, and 67.5 mg TCHP in oil solution, was provided as ampoules, and was administered by intramuscular injection. The medication was manufactured by Roussel and Théramex and was marketed by 1953. It is no longer available.

== See also ==
- List of combined sex-hormonal preparations § Estrogens, progestogens, and androgens
