= Testosterone phenylbutyrate =

Chemical compound

Clinical data
- Other names: Testosterone phenylbutanoate; Testosterone 17β-phenylbutanoate; Androst-4-en-17β-ol-3-one 17β-phenylbutyrate
- Routes of administration: Intramuscular injection

Identifiers
- IUPAC name: (1S,2R,10R,11S,14S,15S)-2,15-Dimethyl-5-oxotetracyclo[8.7.0.0^{2,7}.0^{11,15}]heptadec-6-en-14-yl 4-phenylbutanoate
- CAS Number: 99506-14-6
- PubChem CID: 13489321
- ChemSpider: 58539760
- CompTox Dashboard (EPA): DTXSID401336957

Chemical and physical data
- Formula: C_{29}H_{38}O_{3}
- Molar mass: 434.620 g·mol^{−1}
- 3D model (JSmol): Interactive image
- SMILES: C[C@]12CC[C@H]3[C@@H](CCC4=CC(=O)CC[C@]34C)[C@@H]1CC[C@@H]2OC(=O)CCCC1=CC=CC=C1
- InChI: InChI=1S/C29H38O3/c1-28-17-15-22(30)19-21(28)11-12-23-24-13-14-26(29(24,2)18-16-25(23)28)32-27(31)10-6-9-20-7-4-3-5-8-20/h3-5,7-8,19,23-26H,6,9-18H2,1-2H3/t23-,24-,25-,26-,28-,29-/m0/s1; Key:KPKRHHWUOMEERQ-MPZZESAYSA-N

Testosterone phenylbutyrate, also known as testosterone phenylbutanoate, testosterone 17β-phenylbutyrate, and androst-4-en-17β-ol-3-one 17β-phenylbutyrate, is a synthetic, injected anabolic-androgenic steroid (AAS) and an androgen ester – specifically, the C17β phenylbutyrate (phenylbutanoate) ester of testosterone – which was never marketed. It is a prodrug of testosterone and, when administered via intramuscular injection, is associated with a long-lasting depot effect and extended duration of action.

== See also ==
- Testosterone cyclohexylpropionate
- Testosterone cypionate
- Testosterone phenylacetate
- Testosterone phenylpropionate
