= Α-Tocopheryl palmitate =

Chemical compound

α-Tocopheryl palmitate

Clinical data
- Other names: α-Tocopherol palmitate
- Routes of administration: Intramuscular injection
- Drug class: Vitamin E

Identifiers
- IUPAC name: [2,5,7,8-Tetramethyl-2-(4,8,12-trimethyltridecyl)-3,4-dihydrochromen-6-yl] hexadecanoate
- CAS Number: 34562-29-3
- PubChem CID: 13691242
- ChemSpider: 2341632
- CompTox Dashboard (EPA): DTXSID80956071
- ECHA InfoCard: 100.047.340

Chemical and physical data
- Formula: C_{45}H_{80}O_{3}
- Molar mass: 669.132 g·mol^{−1}
- 3D model (JSmol): Interactive image
- SMILES: CCCCCCCCCCCCCCCC(=O)OC1=C(C(=C2C(=C1C)CCC(O2)(C)CCCC(C)CCCC(C)CCCC(C)C)C)C
- InChI: InChI=1S/C45H80O3/c1-10-11-12-13-14-15-16-17-18-19-20-21-22-31-42(46)47-43-38(6)39(7)44-41(40(43)8)32-34-45(9,48-44)33-25-30-37(5)29-24-28-36(4)27-23-26-35(2)3/h35-37H,10-34H2,1-9H3; Key:GEDVGZULFCXUQL-UHFFFAOYSA-N

α-Tocopheryl palmitate is the palmitate ester of α-tocopherol and is a form of vitamin E. Related compounds include α-tocopheryl acetate and α-tocopheryl succinate.

== See also ==
- Progesterone/hydroxyprogesterone heptanoate/α-tocopherol palmitate
