= Estradiol diundecylenate =

Chemical compound

Clinical data
- Trade names: Etrosteron
- Other names: Estrosteron; Estradiol diundecenoate
- Routes of administration: Intramuscular injection
- Drug class: Estrogen; Estrogen ester

Identifiers
- IUPAC name: [(8R,9S,13S,14S,17S)-13-Ethyl-3-undec-10-enoyloxy-6,7,8,9,11,12,14,15,16,17-decahydrocyclopenta[a]phenanthren-17-yl] undec-10-enoate
- CAS Number: 74798-17-7
- PubChem CID: 126479
- ChemSpider: 112392
- UNII: 68XRU2GP58
- CompTox Dashboard (EPA): DTXSID70996325

Chemical and physical data
- Formula: C_{40}H_{60}O_{4}
- Molar mass: 604.916 g·mol^{−1}
- 3D model (JSmol): Interactive image
- SMILES: C[C@]12CC[C@H]3[C@H]([C@@H]1CC[C@@H]2OC(=O)CCCCCCCCC=C)CCC4=C3C=CC(=C4)OC(=O)CCCCCCCCC=C
- InChI: InChI=1S/C40H60O4/c1-4-6-8-10-12-14-16-18-20-38(41)43-32-23-25-33-31(30-32)22-24-35-34(33)28-29-40(3)36(35)26-27-37(40)44-39(42)21-19-17-15-13-11-9-7-5-2/h4-5,23,25,30,34-37H,1-2,6-22,24,26-29H2,3H3/t34-,35-,36+,37+,40+/m1/s1; Key:LVJFPCSLAMHGAU-OBRFQGJBSA-N

Estradiol diundecylenate (brand name Etrosteron), or estradiol diundecenoate, also known as 17β-estradiol 3,17β-diundec-10-enoate, is a semisynthetic steroidal estrogen and an estrogen ester – specifically, the 3,17β-diundecylenate ester of estradiol – which was previously marketed in Argentina.

== See also ==
- Estradiol undecylenate
- Estradiol diundecylate
- Estradiol undecylate
- List of estrogen esters § Estradiol esters
