= Progesterone/hydroxyprogesterone heptanoate/α-tocopherol palmitate =

Combination drug

P4/OHPH/VE
Combination of
- Progesterone: Progestogen
- Hydroxyprogesterone heptanoate: Progestogen
- α-Tocopherol palmitate: Vitamin E

Clinical data
- Trade names: Tocogestan
- Other names: P4/OHPH/VE; P4/OHPH/α-TP
- Routes of administration: Intramuscular injection

Progesterone/hydroxyprogesterone heptanoate/α-tocopherol palmitate (P4/OHPH/VE), sold under the brand name Tocogestan, is a combination medication of progesterone (P4), a short-acting progestogen, hydroxyprogesterone heptanoate (OHPH), a long-acting progestogen, and α-tocopherol palmitate, a prodrug of α-tocopherol and form of vitamin E, which was previously used in France to support pregnancy in women but is no longer available. It contained 50 mg P4, 200 mg OHPH, and 250 mg in 2 mL oil solution, was provided in the form of 2 mL ampoules, and was administered by intramuscular injection.

== See also ==
- List of combined sex-hormonal preparations § Progestogens
