= Estradiol undecylenate =

Chemical compound

Clinical data
- Other names: SH-368; Estradiol undecenoate; Estra-1,3,5(10)-triene-3,17β-diol 17β-(10-undecenoate)
- Routes of administration: Intramuscular injection
- Drug class: Estrogen; Estrogen ester

Identifiers
- IUPAC name: [(8R,9S,13S,14S,17S)-3-Hydroxy-13-methyl-6,7,8,9,11,12,14,15,16,17-decahydrocyclopenta[a]phenanthren-17-yl] undec-10-enoate
- CAS Number: 85702-61-0
- PubChem CID: 56842583
- ChemSpider: 21165111
- CompTox Dashboard (EPA): DTXSID90234993
- ECHA InfoCard: 100.080.203

Chemical and physical data
- Formula: C_{29}H_{42}O_{3}
- Molar mass: 438.652 g·mol^{−1}
- 3D model (JSmol): Interactive image
- SMILES: C[C@]12CC[C@H]3[C@H]([C@@H]1CC[C@@H]2OC(=O)CCCCCCCCC=C)CCC4=C3C=CC(=C4)O
- InChI: InChI=1S/C29H42O3/c1-3-4-5-6-7-8-9-10-11-28(31)32-27-17-16-26-25-14-12-21-20-22(30)13-15-23(21)24(25)18-19-29(26,27)2/h3,13,15,20,24-27,30H,1,4-12,14,16-19H2,2H3/t24-,25-,26+,27+,29+/m1/s1; Key:VJTIEHBTPQORML-GVGNIZHQSA-N

Estradiol undecylenate (EUe; developmental code name SH-368) is an estrogen medication and estrogen ester which was never marketed. It is the C17β undecenoate (undecylenate) ester of estradiol. Following an intramuscular injection, EUe has a very prolonged effect, exceeding that of other estradiol esters like estradiol valerate and estradiol enanthate. Due to its very long duration of action, EUe releases only subthreshold amounts of estradiol at conventional doses. However, this may still be useful in menopausal hormone therapy.

== See also ==
- Estradiol diundecylenate
- List of estrogen esters § Estradiol esters
