= Estrapronicate/hydroxyprogesterone heptanoate/nandrolone undecanoate =

Combination drug

EPC/OHPH/NU
Combination of
- Estrapronicate: Estrogen
- Hydroxyprogesterone heptanoate: Progestogen
- Nandrolone undecanoate: Androgen; Anabolic steroid

Clinical data
- Trade names: Trophobolene, Trophoboline
- Other names: EPC/OHPH/NU
- Pregnancy category: f
- Routes of administration: Intramuscular injection

Identifiers
- CAS Number: 80238-09-1

Estrapronicate/hydroxyprogesterone heptanoate/nandrolone undecanoate (EPC/OHPH/NU), tentative brand name Trophobolene or Trophoboline, is an injectable combination medication of estrapronicate (EPC; estradiol nicotinate propionate), an estrogen, hydroxyprogesterone heptanoate (OHPH), a progestogen, and nandrolone undecanoate (NU), an androgen/anabolic steroid, which was never marketed. It contained 1.3 mg EPC, 80 mg OHPH, and 50 mg NU in oil solution and was administered by intramuscular injection. The medication was developed by Théramex in the mid-to-late 1960s. It was studied for use for a variety of indications, including treatment of coronary insufficiency, growth deficiency, and osteoporosis, as well as hormonal disorders in gonadotropin deficiency.

In contrast to other anabolic steroid-containing preparations, EPC/OHPH/NU reportedly had no masculinizing effects, and its estrogenic component likewise reportedly had no feminizing effects. The nicotinic acid (niacin; vitamin B3) derived from estrapronicate was said to enhance the nutrient, relaxant, and antiadipose effects of the estrogenic component.

The pharmacokinetics of nandrolone undecanoate in this combination preparation have been studied as well as compared to nandrolone alone (Dynabolon).

== See also ==
- List of combined sex-hormonal preparations § Estrogens, progestogens, and androgens
