= Idiopathic pneumonia syndrome =

- Specialty: Pulmonology
- Causes: Stem cell transplant

Idiopathic pneumonia syndrome (IPS) is a set of pneumonia-like symptoms that occur with no sign of infection in the lung. Idiopathic pneumonia syndrome is a serious condition that occurs as a complication of a stem cell transplant.

== Symptoms ==
The symptoms are pneumonia-like, and include fever, chills, coughing, and breathing problems.

== Risk factors ==
IPS is a complication of a stem cell transplant. The incubation period ranges between 4 and 106 days, but mostly is about 22 days from transplant.

Additional risk factors for IPS include total body irradiation dose, age, graft vs host disease, and multi organ failure.

While older reports suggest a rate of as high as 15% of stem cell transplants resulting in IPS, recent studies suggest this is lowering.

== Diagnosis ==
If a patient develops symptoms of IPS after a stem-cell transplant, IPS is a de facto diagnosis if there is no identifiable cause of infection.

== Treatment ==
Treatment is supportive. IPS is associated with morbidity and poor long-term recovery. While steroids are often used and help with short term outcomes, but do not improve 1-year mortality. Etanercept, a TNFa binding protein also improves short term outcomes, but with no effect on 1-year mortality.
