= Pod mod =

Type of electronic cigarette

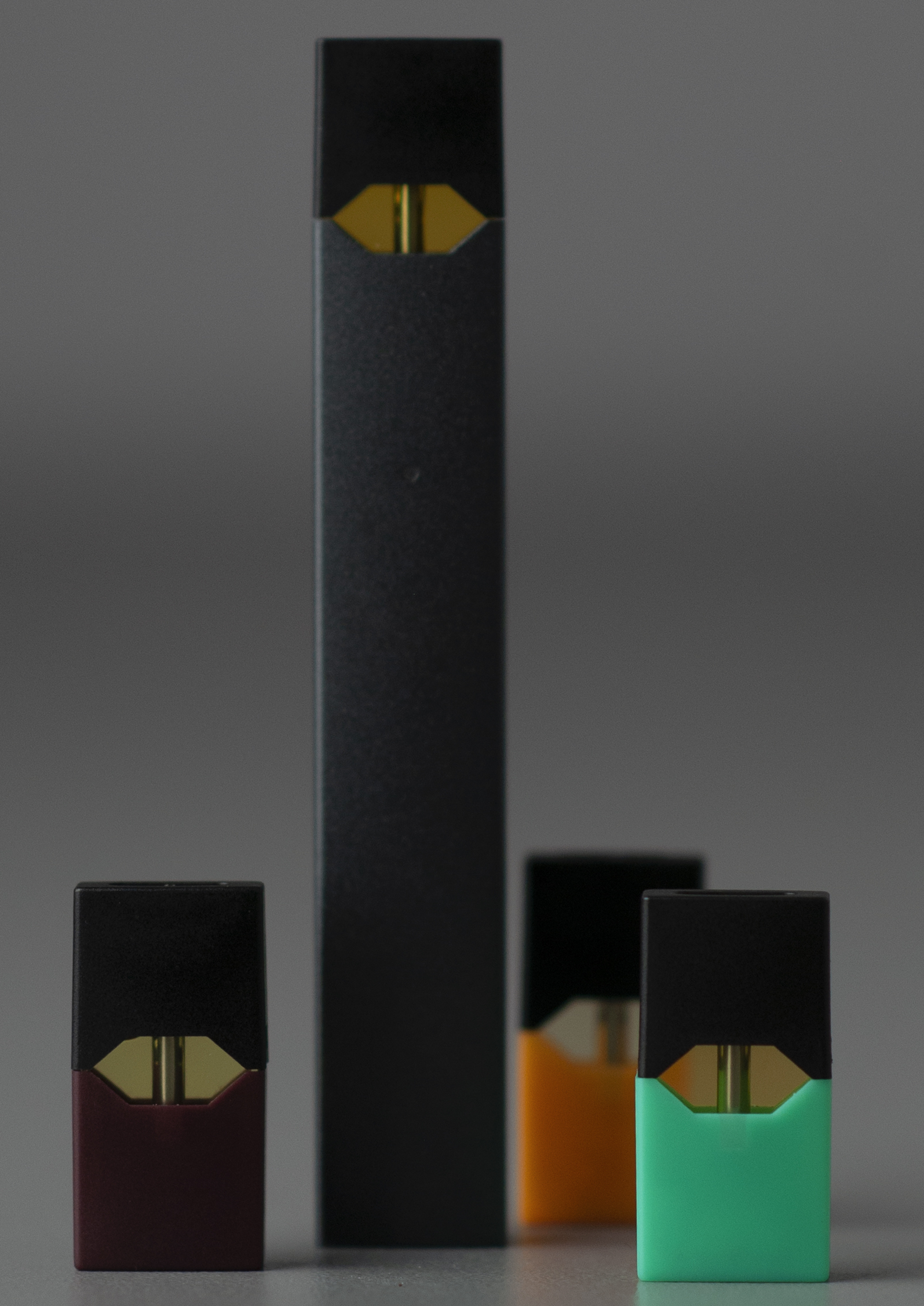
A pod mod with cartridges

Pod mods are a type of electronic cigarette used to vape nicotine through a mouthpiece connected to the body of the device by magnets. These devices are a newer generation of e-cigarettes that are often marketed to a younger crowd that do not wish to attract attention gained through regular e-cigarettes or traditional tobacco-burning cigarettes. Pod mods contain a disposable cartridge and coils.

Pod mods were designed to provide higher nicotine delivery with a smaller amount of power than conventional e-cigarettes. Refillable pods can be filled with conventional freebase nicotine liquid or nicotine salts into the empty pod cartridges with varying levels of nicotine often at 2.5% and a maximum of 6.0%. Although, in some countries such as the United Kingdom, the maximum legal limit of nicotine containing liquids is a concentration of 2% or 20mg/ml.

The first to introduce pod mods was Pax Labs in June 2015, and since then many companies began introducing similar products.

== Influences ==
=== Health ===
As these devices are created with the intent of replicating smoke produced from traditional cigarettes, they produce greater levels of nicotine than e-cigarettes, however the health risks are currently undetermined as they are new productions. Research reveals potential health risks in aerosolizing nicotine salts and metal toxins that are produced. As there are a variety of different organic compounds put into different flavours, the health risks of these are also unknown and not well-studied.

A study revealed that 80% of users ages 15-24 continually use the product after an initial trial as they do not have the adverse effects of traditional cigarettes. These sensations include a burning throat, the distasteful flavour of smoke and the smell left on the body afterward. However, pod mods and e-cigarettes take away some of the difficulties surrounding traditional cigarettes including no smoke, relatively cheaper than tobacco smoke and discrete, leaving a younger demographic more susceptible to addiction.

=== Science ===
Co-founders at Solace recreated nicotine salts through a combination of various acids, eventually settling on benzoic acids although many types of acids may be used to create nicotine salts. According to The Verge the first company to utilize nicotine salts in e-liquids was BAT claiming to have used them since 2012 in various products. Traditional e-cigarettes use free-based nicotine liquids, whereas pod mods use nicotine salts which give them a larger dose of nicotine per inhalation. Head of scientific affairs at Imperial Brands Grant O’Connell suggests nicotine salts are stronger due to their ability to circulate the body faster from faster absorption in the lungs.

Each milliliter of a pod that uses nicotine of 5% is equivalent to nicotine found in 20 traditional cigarettes. Nicotine salts are created with free base nicotine and benzoic acid to produce an ionized(+) solution that is less volatile- smaller clouds- and less harsh, often described as smooth in anecdotal research. Free-base nicotine found in e-cigarette juice and tobacco cigarettes often stick to the respiratory tract whereas nicotine salts are unlikely to, giving them the higher percentage of nicotine delivery.

=== Design ===
Pod mods come in varying shapes and sizes and some are styled after USB flash drives.

== Industry regulation ==
=== Concerns ===
Juul is the leader in the US pod market with 49.6% of the market share. Researchers recently conducted a study that revealed that 63% of participants who have used a Juul (popular pod brand) were not aware that nicotine was present in the product. Literature suggests that the use of pods may be the stepping stone to smoking. There are currently minimal regulations and restrictions on the use of pod mods legally. Due to the unknown nature of first-hand and second-hand inhalation of pod mod usages, some governments and schools are taking preventive action. High nicotine delivery of pod mods leave people potentially more susceptible to nicotine dependency and addiction than smoking cigarettes. Many organizations including Substance Abuse and Mental Health Services Administration’s National Registry of Evidence-Based Programs and Practices aim to educate students and teachers about the health-related risks of using pod mods and such products.

=== Restriction ===
In 2018, the FDA (Food and Drug Administration) has been urged by public interests and politicians to restrict the sales of pod mods in the United States. In April 2018 the Food and Drug Administration began a nation-wide intervention on the resale of pod mods through websites other than its official site. In addition to this, undercover operations have been conducted to prevent the sales of pods to minors through physical vendors. Some companies have been required to provide information on how their products of pods will not be marketed towards young people and how they will deter these users from their products.
