= Oxogestone phenpropionate =

Chemical compound

Clinical data
- Other names: Oxogesterone phenpropionate; Xinogestone; Oxageston; 20β-Hydroxy-19-norprogesterone phenylpropionate; 20β-Dihydro-19-norprogesterone 20β-(3-phenylpropionate); 20β-Hydroxy-19-norpregn-4-en-3-one 20β-(3-phenylpropionate); (20R)-3-Oxo-19-norpregn-4-en-20-yl 3-phenylpropanoate
- Routes of administration: intramuscular injection
- Drug class: Progestogen; Progestogen ester

Identifiers
- IUPAC name: [(1R)-1-[(8R,9S,10R,13S,14S,17S)-13-methyl-3-oxo-2,6,7,8,9,10,11,12,14,15,16,17-dodecahydro-1H-cyclopenta[a]phenanthren-17-yl]ethyl] 3-phenylpropanoate
- CAS Number: 16915-80-3
- PubChem CID: 20055360
- ChemSpider: 16736681
- UNII: 7IA4J676HM
- KEGG: D05308
- ChEMBL: ChEMBL2107303
- CompTox Dashboard (EPA): DTXSID20937602

Chemical and physical data
- Formula: C_{29}H_{38}O_{3}
- Molar mass: 434.620 g·mol^{−1}
- 3D model (JSmol): Interactive image
- SMILES: CC(C1CCC2C1(CCC3C2CCC4=CC(=O)CCC34)C)OC(=O)CCC5=CC=CC=C5
- InChI: InChI=1S/C29H38O3/c1-19(32-28(31)15-8-20-6-4-3-5-7-20)26-13-14-27-25-11-9-21-18-22(30)10-12-23(21)24(25)16-17-29(26,27)2/h3-7,18-19,23-27H,8-17H2,1-2H3/t19-,23+,24-,25-,26-,27+,29-/m1/s1; Key:LHPBUFXEIOLURH-GQZONRFDSA-N

Oxogestone phenpropionate (OPP; USAN) (former developmental code name or tentative brand name Oxageston), also known as xinogestone, as well as 20β-hydroxy-19-norprogesterone 20β-(3-phenylpropionate), is a progestin related to the 19-norprogesterone derivatives which was developed as an injectable hormonal contraceptive, specifically a progestogen-only injectable contraceptive, in the 1960s and early 1970s but was never marketed. It was studied at a dose of 50 to 75 mg once a month by intramuscular injection but was associated with a high failure rate with this regimen and was not further developed. OPP is the 20β-(3-phenylpropionate) ester of oxogestone, which, similarly, was never marketed.

Parenteral potencies and durations of progestogens (Note: Sources:) (Note: All given by intramuscular or subcutaneous injection.)
Compound	Form	Dose for specific uses (mg) (Note: Progesterone production during the luteal phase is ~25 (15–50) mg/day. The OID of OHPC is 250 to 500 mg/month.)			DOA (Note: Duration of action in days.)
Compound	Form	TFD (Note: Usually given for 14 days.)	POICD (Note: Usually dosed every two to three months.)	CICD (Note: Usually dosed once monthly.)	DOA
Algestone acetophenide	Oil soln.	–	–	75–150	14–32 d
Gestonorone caproate	Oil soln.	25–50	–	–	8–13 d
Hydroxyprogest. acetate (Note: Never marketed or approved by this route.)	Aq. susp.	350	–	–	9–16 d
Hydroxyprogest. caproate	Oil soln.	250–500 (Note: In divided doses (2 × 125 or 250 mg for OHPC, 10 × 20 mg for P4).)	–	250–500	5–21 d
Medroxyprog. acetate	Aq. susp.	50–100	150	25	14–50+ d
Megestrol acetate	Aq. susp.	–	–	25	>14 d
Norethisterone enanthate	Oil soln.	100–200	200	50	11–52 d
Progesterone	Oil soln.	200	–	–	2–6 d
Progesterone	Aq. soln.	?	–	–	1–2 d
Progesterone	Aq. susp.	50–200	–	–	7–14 d
Notes and sources:

== See also ==
- List of progestogen esters
