= Estradiol diundecylate =

Chemical compound

Clinical data
- Other names: Estradiol diundecanoate
- Routes of administration: Intramuscular injection
- Drug class: Estrogen; Estrogen ester

Identifiers
- IUPAC name: [(8R,9S,13S,14S,17S)-13-methyl-3-undecanoyloxy-6,7,8,9,11,12,14,15,16,17-decahydrocyclopenta[a]phenanthren-17-yl] undecanoate
- CAS Number: 1263-57-6
- PubChem CID: 66422
- ChemSpider: 59796
- CompTox Dashboard (EPA): DTXSID70925498

Chemical and physical data
- Formula: C_{40}H_{64}O_{4}
- Molar mass: 608.948 g·mol^{−1}
- 3D model (JSmol): Interactive image
- SMILES: CCCCCCCCCCC(=O)O[C@H]1CC[C@H]2[C@@H]3CCc4cc(OC(=O)CCCCCCCCCC)ccc4[C@H]3CC[C@]12C
- InChI: InChI=1S/C40H64O4/c1-4-6-8-10-12-14-16-18-20-38(41)43-32-23-25-33-31(30-32)22-24-35-34(33)28-29-40(3)36(35)26-27-37(40)44-39(42)21-19-17-15-13-11-9-7-5-2/h23,25,30,34-37H,4-22,24,26-29H2,1-3H3/t34-,35-,36+,37+,40+/m1/s1; Key:PWQIMJUJIMPDSQ-OBRFQGJBSA-N

Estradiol diundecylate (brand name Estrolent), or estradiol diundecanoate, also known as 17β-estradiol 3,17β-diundecylate, is an estrogen and an estrogen ester – specifically, the 3,17β-diundecylate ester of estradiol – which has been marketed in Romania. It was described, along with a variety of other estradiol esters such as estradiol undecylate, by Karl Junkmann of Schering AG in 1953.

== See also ==
- Estradiol diundecylate/hydroxyprogesterone heptanoate/testosterone cyclohexylpropionate
- Estradiol diundecylenate
- Estradiol undecylate
- List of estrogen esters § Estradiol esters
