= Α-Tocopheryl acetate =

Vitamin

α-Tocopheryl acetate
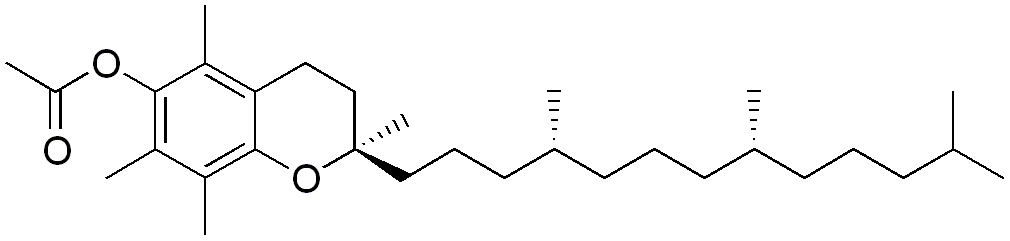

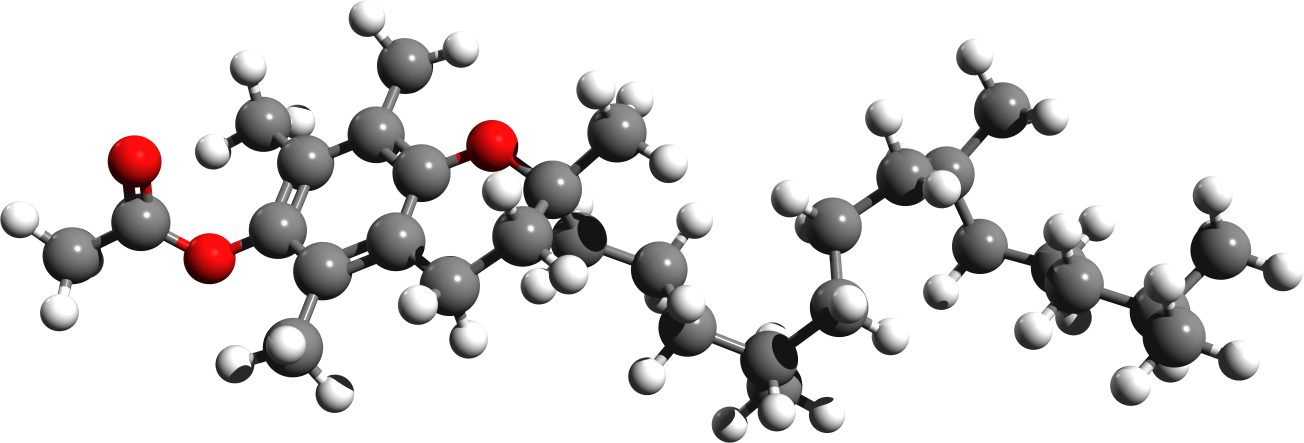

Names
- Preferred IUPAC name (2R)-2,5,7,8-Tetramethyl-2-[(4R,8R)-4,8,12-trimethyltridecyl]-3,4-dihydro-2H-1-benzopyran-6-yl acetate
- Other names α-Tocopherol acetate Vitamin E acetate

Identifiers
CAS Number	58-95-7 RRR-α-isomer
3D model (JSmol)	Interactive image
ChEMBL	ChEMBL1047
ChemSpider	77987
DrugBank	DB14003
ECHA InfoCard	100.000.369
PubChem CID	86472
UNII	A7E6112E4N
CompTox Dashboard (EPA)	DTXSID1031096
- InChI: InChI=1S/C31H52O3/c1-21(2)13-10-14-22(3)15-11-16-23(4)17-12-19-31(9)20-18-28-26(7)29(33-27(8)32)24(5)25(6)30(28)34-31/h21-23H,10-20H2,1-9H3/t22-,23-,31-/m1/s1 Key: ZAKOWWREFLAJOT-CEFNRUSXSA-N; InChI=1/C31H52O3/c1-21(2)13-10-14-22(3)15-11-16-23(4)17-12-19-31(9)20-18-28-26(7)29(33-27(8)32)24(5)25(6)30(28)34-31/h21-23H,10-20H2,1-9H3/t22-,23-,31-/m1/s1 Key: ZAKOWWREFLAJOT-CEFNRUSXBQ
- SMILES: O=C(Oc2c(c(c1O[C@](CCc1c2C)(C)CCC[C@H](C)CCC[C@H](C)CCCC(C)C)C)C)C

Properties
Chemical formula	C_{31}H_{52}O_{3}
Molar mass	472.743 g/mol
Appearance	pale yellow, viscous liquid
Melting point	27.5 °C
Boiling point	240 °C decays without boiling
Solubility in water	insoluble
Solubility	soluble in acetone, chloroform, diethyl ether; poorly soluble in ethanol

Hazards
NFPA 704 (fire diamond)	1 1 0
- Except where otherwise noted, data are given for materials in their standard state (at 25 °C [77 °F], 100 kPa). verify (what is ?) Infobox references

α-Tocopheryl acetate (alpha-tocopherol acetate), also known as vitamin E acetate, is a form of vitamin E. Specifically, it is the ester of acetic acid and α-tocopherol, which can be digested into the actual vitamin.

Like α-tocopherol itself, there are different stereoisomers of α-tocopheryl acetate. Two main forms are D-α-tocopherol acetate, made from the natural D or RRR form of α-tocopherol, and DL-α-tocopherol acetate (more properly called all-rac-α-tocopherol acetate), made from the synthetic racemic mixture.

α-Tocopheryl acetate is often used in dermatological products such as skin creams. Unlike free tocopherol, it is not easily oxidized and can penetrate through the skin to the living cells, where about 5% is converted to free tocopherol.

The U.S. Centers for Disease Control and Prevention says that vitamin E acetate is a very strong culprit of concern in the 2019 outbreak of vaping-associated pulmonary injury (VAPI), but there is not yet sufficient evidence to rule out contributions from other chemicals. Vaporization of this ester produces toxic pyrolysis products.

Tocopheryl acetate was first synthesized in 1963 by researchers at Hoffmann-La Roche.

== Use in cosmetics ==
As a source of vitamin E, α-tocopheryl acetate is used in cosmetics for its alleged antioxidant benefits. α-Tocopheryl acetate is used as an alternative to tocopherol itself because the phenolic hydroxyl group is blocked, providing a less acidic product with a longer shelf life. It is believed that the acetate is slowly hydrolyzed after it is absorbed into the skin, regenerating tocopherol and providing protection against the sun's ultraviolet rays.

Although there is widespread use of tocopheryl acetate as a topical medication, with claims for improved wound healing and reduced scar tissue, reviews have repeatedly concluded that there is insufficient evidence to support these claims.

There are reports of vitamin E-induced allergic contact dermatitis from use of vitamin E derivatives such as tocopheryl linoleate and tocopherol acetate in skin care products. Incidence is low despite widespread use.

== Misuse ==
=== Ingredient in vape liquids ===
On September 5, 2019, the United States Food and Drug Administration (US FDA) announced that 10 out of 18, or 56% of the samples of vape liquids sent in by states, linked to the then recent vaping-related lung disease outbreak in the United States, tested positive for vitamin E acetate which had been used as a thickening agent by illicit THC vape cartridge manufacturers. On November 8, 2019, the Centers for Disease Control and Prevention (CDC) identified vitamin E acetate as a very strong culprit of concern in the vaping-related illnesses, but has not ruled out other chemicals or toxicants as possible causes. The CDC's findings were based on fluid samples from the lungs of 29 patients with vaping-associated pulmonary injury, which provided direct evidence of vitamin E acetate at the primary site of injury in all the 29 lung fluid samples tested. Research suggests when vitamin E acetate is inhaled, it may interfere with normal lung functioning. A 2020 study found that vaporizing vitamin E acetate produced carcinogenic alkenes and benzene, but also exceptionally toxic ketene gas, which may be a contributing factor to the pulmonary injuries.

== Chemistry ==
At room temperature, α-tocopheryl acetate is a fat-soluble liquid. It has 3 chiral centers and thus 8 stereoisomers. It is made by esterifying α-tocopherol with acetic acid. 2R,4R,8R-isomer, also known as RRR-α-tocopheryl acetate, is the most common isomer used for various purposes. This is because α-tocopherol occurs in nature primarily as RRR-α-tocopherol.

α-Tocopheryl acetate does not boil at atmospheric pressure and begins to degrade at 240 °C. It can be vacuum distilled: it boils at 184 °C at 0.01 mmHg, at 194 °C (0.025 mmHg) and at 224 °C (0.3 mmHg). In practice, it is not degraded notably by air, visible light or UV-radiation. It has a refractive index of 1.4950–1.4972 at 20 °C.

α-Tocopheryl acetate is hydrolyzed to α-tocopherol and acetic acid under suitable conditions or when ingested by people.
