= Lipid pneumonia =

- Other names: Lipid pneumonia, lipoid pneumonia, cholesterol pneumonia
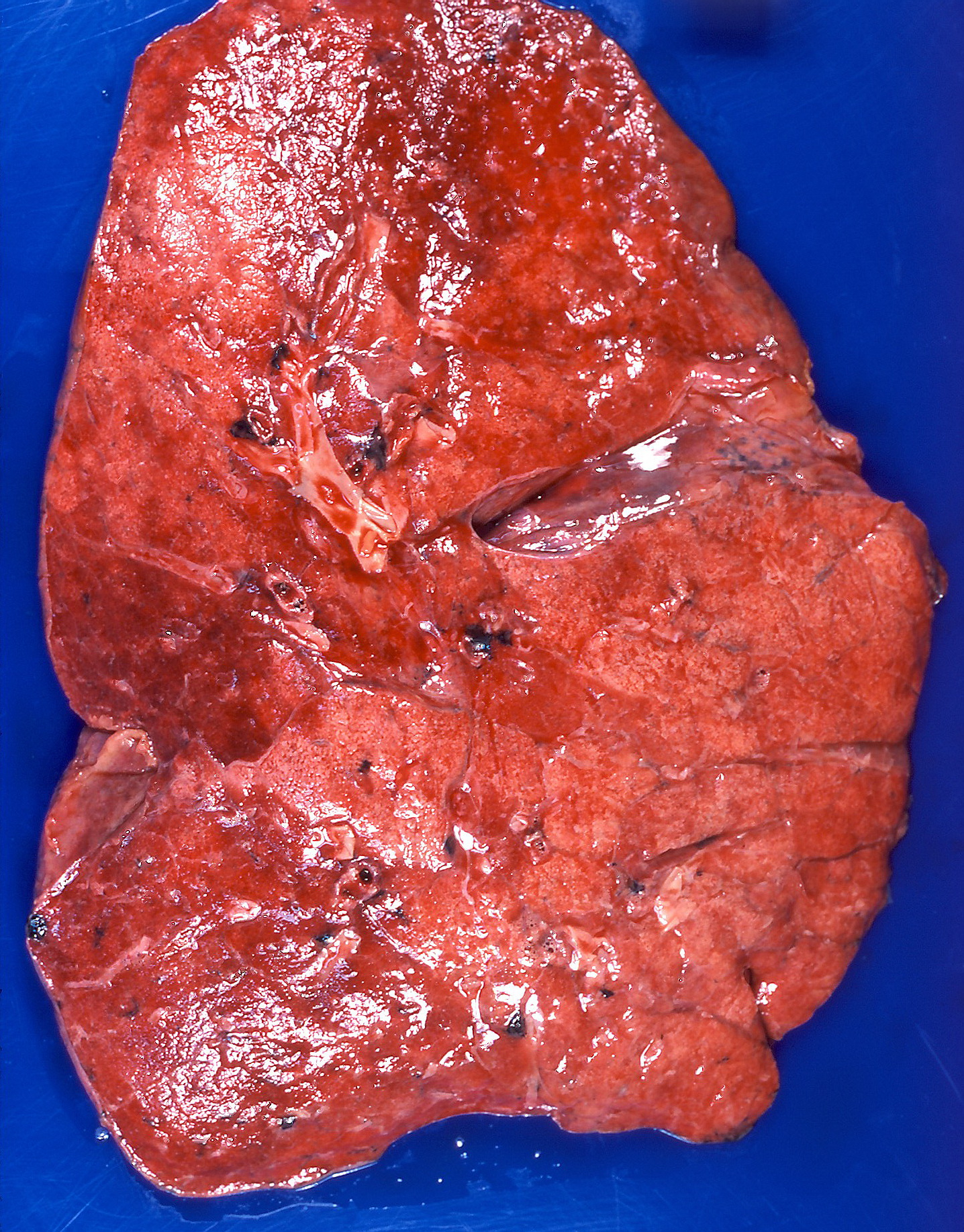
- Lipid pneumonia, exogenous Case 108
- Specialty: Pulmonology

Lipoid pneumonia, also known as lipid pneumonia, is a rare form of lung inflammation (pneumonia) that develops when lipids (fats) enter the bronchial tree through aspiration or inhalation.

== Signs and symptoms ==
Lipoid pneumonia can present as a foreign body reaction causing cough, dyspnea, and often fever. However, it is also commonly identified during autopsy after the death of a patient with respiratory compromise. Hemoptysis, chest pain, and weight loss have also been reported.

== Causes ==
Lipoid pneumonia is most frequently caused by aspiration or inhalation of oil. Sources of these lipoids could be either exogenous or endogenous.

=== Exogenous ===
Exogenous lipoid pneumonia refers to lipoid pneumonia caused by something from outside of the body. Inhaled or aspirated oil gathers in the lungs causing the disease. This is most commonly found in people who are at high risk of aspiration such as elderly people, people with GERD. People who work with mineral oils compounds in industrial settings are also at high risk.

Other examples of exogenous lipoid pneumonia causes include

- Inhalation of oil-based nose drops
- Application of oil-based ointments such as Vaseline in the nasal passage
- Vaping, causing electronic vaping-associated lung injury (EVALI)
- Amiodarone (an anti-arrhythmic)
- Oil pulling
- Inhalation cosmetic oils, mineral oil, castor oil, shark liver oil
- Inhalation of oil-based laxatives
- Fire breather's pneumonia from the inhalation of hydrocarbon fuel is a specific variant

For patients at high risk of aspiration, switching to water-soluble alternatives may be helpful. Exogenous lipoid pneumonia can range from acute to chronic.

==== Tuberculosis ====
One example of exogenous lipoid pneumonia is in the early stages of secondary tuberculosis. This may be due to high content of mycolic acid, cord factor, and Wax-D in the cell wall of M. tuberculosis, that has long been speculated to be a virulence factor of the mycobacteria.

=== Endogenous ===
Endogenous lipoid pneumonia refers to lipoid pneumonia caused by something from inside of the body. This can occur in the setting of airway obstruction. In response to bronchial damage, lung tissue releases fat and cholesterol. Additionally, lipoid-laden macrophages and giant cells accumulate in the isolated bronchial airspace distal to the obstruction. The disorder is sometimes called cholesterol pneumonia or idiopathic pneumonia. Other causes of endogenous lipoid pneumonia include:

- Lipid storage diseases (e.g. Gaucher's disease)
- Wolman's disease
- Lung tumors
- Ongoing inflammation from another disease

== Appearance ==
The gross appearance of a lipoid pneumonia changes during different stages of the disease. The lung can appear gray, yellow, or gray-white and may exude oil or form nodules or cavities.

At the microscopic scale, lipoid pneumonia is characterized by abundant foamy macrophages and giant cells. There may also be lipoid vacuoles, and cholesterol clefts. If necrosis is present, there is likely an infection such as secondary tuberculosis.

On CT, lipoid pneumonia appears as a "crazy paving" pattern, characterized by ground glass opacities with interspersed interlobular septal thickening.

== Diagnosis ==
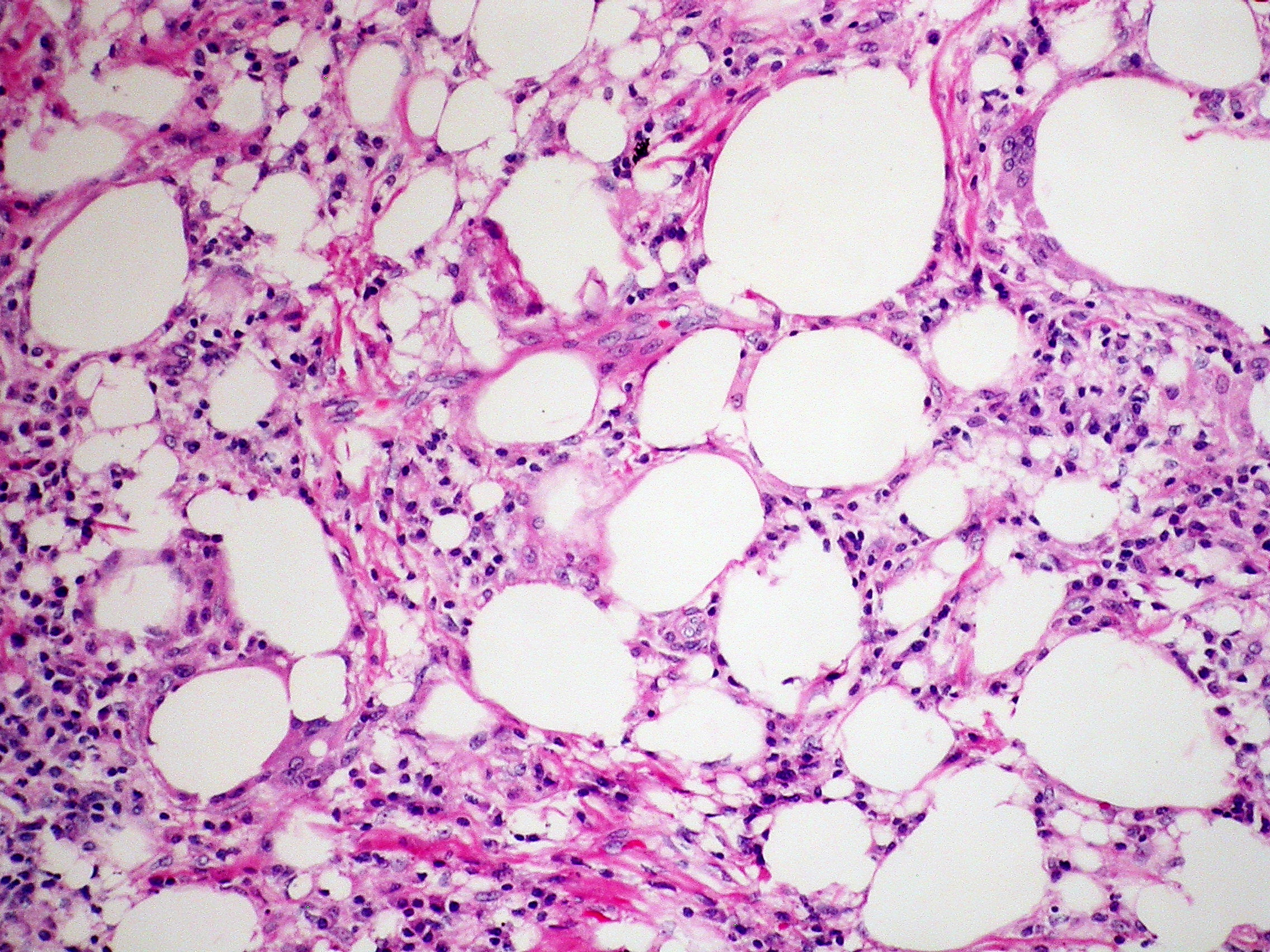
lipoid pneumonia-exogenous

Definitive diagnosis is made with histologic analysis of a lung biopsy or bronchoalveolar lavage sample from a bronchoscopy.

Evaluation of lipoid pneumonia may also include the following:

- Imaging such as Chest X-ray or CT scan
- Arterial blood gas (pH)

== Management ==
Treatment of lipid pneumonia includes removing the inciting agent and supportive care. Typically, the disease resolves if the inciting agent is removed.

There is limited research on the effectiveness of the following treatments:

- Segmental lung lavage (for severe aspiration)
- Corticosteroids
- Intravenous immunoglobulins

== Prognosis ==
The majority of people with lipoid pneumonia experience full recovery. However, those with chronic lipoid pneumonia may develop permanent lung scarring.

== Epidemiology ==
Lipoid pneumonia typically affects people who are at a high risk of aspiration. This includes:

- Elderly people
- people with Gastroesophageal reflux disease

Other at risk groups include:

- people with Lipid storage disorders such as Gaucher disease or Niemann-Pick Disease.
- People who work with oils in an industrial setting.
- Underwater divers (after breathing poorly filtered air supplied by an oil-lubricated surface compressor).
- People who vape.
- Recreational fire-breathers and fire-eaters due to accidentally inhaling or aspirating petroleum-based or fatty-fuels such as liquid paraffin.

== History ==
Laughlen first described lipoid pneumonia in 1925 with infants that inhaled oil droplets. It was previously an incidental finding found at an autopsy of a patient with respiratory failure, but is now diagnosed more frequently.
