= Nandrolone undecanoate =

Chemical compound

Clinical data
- Trade names: Dynabolon, Dynabolin, Psychobolan
- Other names: NU; Nandrolone undecylate; 19-Nortestosterone 17β-undecanoate
- Routes of administration: Intramuscular injection
- Drug class: Androgen; Anabolic steroid; Androgen ester; Progestogen

Identifiers
- IUPAC name: [(8R,9S,10R,13S,14S,17S)-13-methyl-3-oxo-2,6,7,8,9,10,11,12,14,15,16,17-dodecahydro-1H-cyclopenta[a]phenanthren-17-yl] undecanoate
- CAS Number: 862-89-5
- PubChem CID: 94193
- ChemSpider: 23089252
- UNII: K64MCF1I9Z
- CompTox Dashboard (EPA): DTXSID701006644
- ECHA InfoCard: 100.011.573

Chemical and physical data
- Formula: C_{29}H_{46}O_{3}
- Molar mass: 442.684 g·mol^{−1}
- 3D model (JSmol): Interactive image
- SMILES: CCCCCCCCCCC(=O)O[C@H]1CC[C@@H]2[C@@]1(CC[C@H]3[C@H]2CCC4=CC(=O)CC[C@H]34)C
- InChI: InChI=1S/C29H46O3/c1-3-4-5-6-7-8-9-10-11-28(31)32-27-17-16-26-25-14-12-21-20-22(30)13-15-23(21)24(25)18-19-29(26,27)2/h20,23-27H,3-19H2,1-2H3/t23-,24+,25+,26-,27-,29-/m0/s1; Key:GRAAWEGTURLYKP-MVTMSODMSA-N

Nandrolone undecanoate (NU), also known as nandrolone undecylate, and sold under the brand names Dynabolon, Dynabolin, and Psychobolan, is an androgen and anabolic steroid medication and a nandrolone ester. It was developed in the 1960s, and was previously marketed in France, Germany, Italy, and Monaco, but has since been discontinued and is now no longer known to be available. The pharmacokinetics of nandrolone undecanoate alone (Dynabolon) and in combination with other steroid esters (Trophobolene) have been studied and compared.

Relative affinities (%) of nandrolone and related steroids
Compound	PR	AR	ER	GR	MR	SHBG	CBG
Nandrolone	20	154–155	<0.1	0.5	1.6	1–16	0.1
Testosterone	1.0–1.2	100	<0.1	0.17	0.9	19–82	3–8
Estradiol	2.6	7.9	100	0.6	0.13	8.7–12	<0.1
Notes: Values are percentages (%). Reference ligands (100%) were progesterone for the PR, testosterone for the AR, estradiol for the ER, dexamethasone for the GR, aldosterone for the MR, dihydrotestosterone for SHBG, and cortisol for CBG. Sources: See template.

== See also ==
- List of androgen esters § Nandrolone esters
- Estrapronicate/hydroxyprogesterone heptanoate/nandrolone undecanoate
