= Testosterone cyclohexylpropionate =

Chemical compound

Clinical data
- Trade names: Andromar, Femolone, Telipex Retard
- Other names: TCHP; Testosterone 17β-(3-cyclohexyl)propionate
- Routes of administration: Intramuscular injection

Identifiers
- IUPAC name: [(8R,9S,10R,13S,14S,17S)-10,13-dimethyl-3-oxo-1,2,6,7,8,9,11,12,14,15,16,17-dodecahydrocyclopenta[a]phenanthren-17-yl] 3-cyclohexylpropanoate
- CAS Number: 2034-94-8
- PubChem CID: 102200
- ChemSpider: 92331
- UNII: 930D2884KV
- CompTox Dashboard (EPA): DTXSID60942497
- ECHA InfoCard: 100.016.363

Chemical and physical data
- Formula: C_{28}H_{42}O_{3}
- Molar mass: 426.641 g·mol^{−1}
- 3D model (JSmol): Interactive image
- SMILES: C[C@]12CC[C@H]3[C@H]([C@@H]1CC[C@@H]2OC(=O)CCC4CCCCC4)CCC5=CC(=O)CC[C@]35C
- InChI: InChI=1S/C28H42O3/c1-27-16-14-21(29)18-20(27)9-10-22-23-11-12-25(28(23,2)17-15-24(22)27)31-26(30)13-8-19-6-4-3-5-7-19/h18-19,22-25H,3-17H2,1-2H3/t22-,23-,24-,25-,27-,28-/m0/s1; Key:HFFZTSFKTLANED-FEZCWRLCSA-N

Testosterone cyclohexylpropionate (TCHP; brand names Andromar, Femolone, Telipex Retard) is an androgen and anabolic steroid and a testosterone ester.

== See also ==
- Estradiol diundecylate/hydroxyprogesterone heptanoate/testosterone cyclohexylpropionate
- List of combined sex-hormonal preparations § Androgens
