= Estradiol enanthate =

Chemical compound

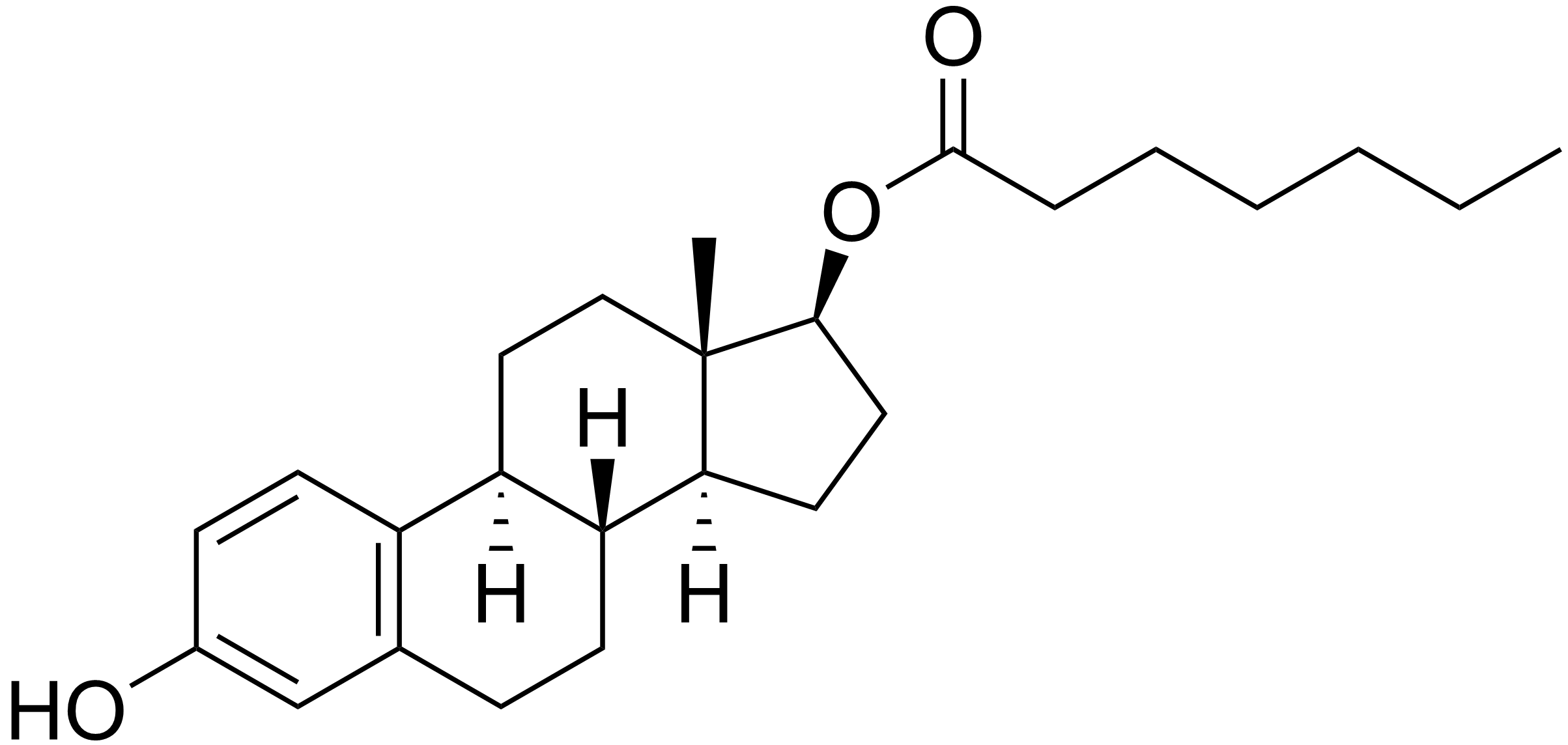

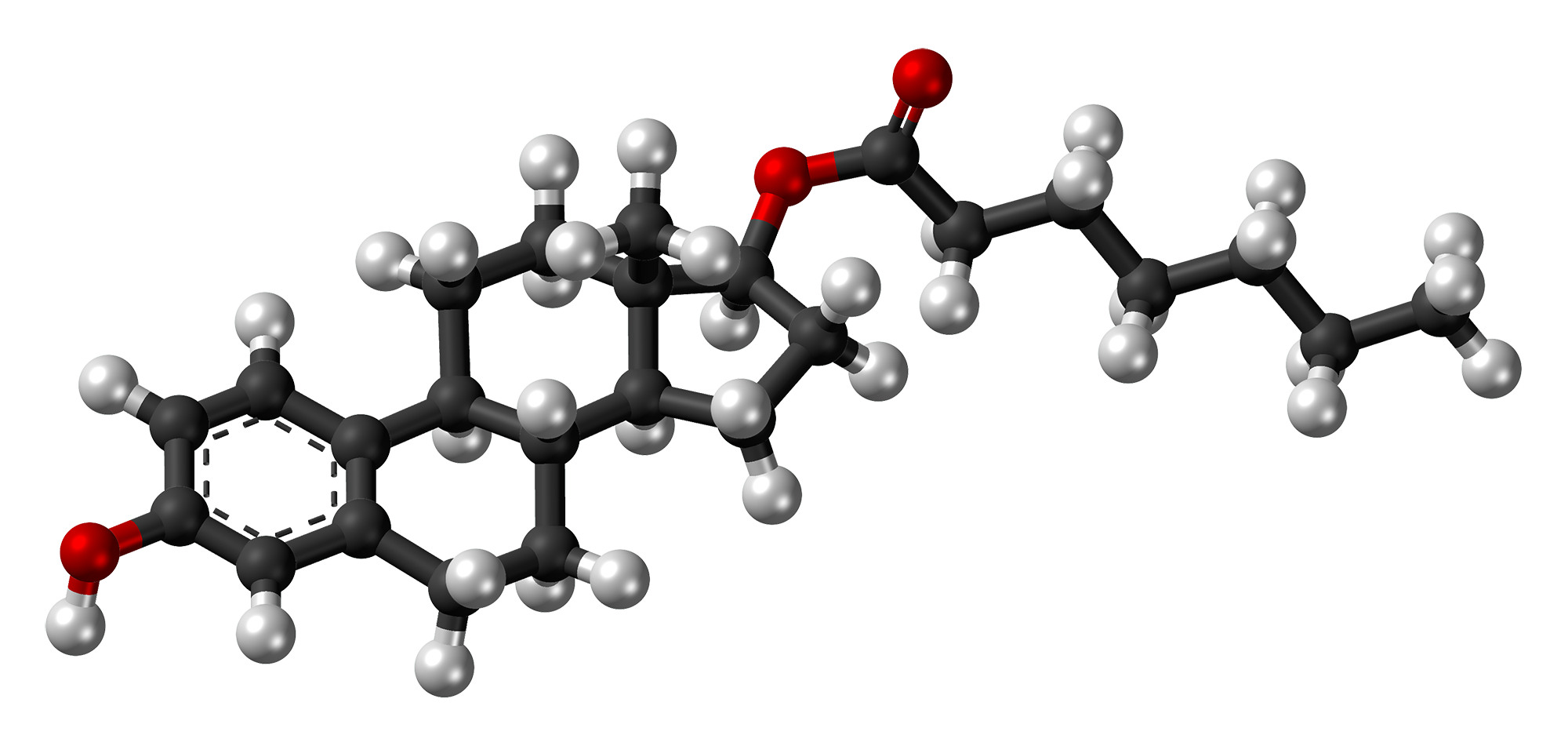

Clinical data
- Trade names: Perlutal, Topasel, Unalmes, Yectames, others
- Other names: EEn; E2-EN; EE; E2E; Estradiol enantate; Estradiol heptanoate; SQ-16150
- Routes of administration: Intramuscular injection
- Drug class: Estrogen; Estrogen ester
- ATC code: G03CA03 (WHO)

Legal status
- Legal status: In general: ℞ (Prescription only)

Pharmacokinetic data
- Bioavailability: IM: High
- Protein binding: Estradiol: ~98% (to albumin and SHBG)
- Metabolism: Cleavage via esterases in the liver, blood, and tissues
- Metabolites: Estradiol, heptanoic acid, and metabolites of estradiol
- Elimination half-life: IM: 5.6–7.5 days
- Duration of action: IM (10 mg): ~20–30 days
- Excretion: Urine

Identifiers
- IUPAC name: [(8R,9S,13S,14S,17S)-3-hydroxy-13-methyl-6,7,8,9,11,12,14,15,16,17-decahydrocyclopenta[a]phenanthren-17-yl] heptanoate
- CAS Number: 4956-37-0
- PubChem CID: 21070
- ChemSpider: 19815
- UNII: PAP315WZIA
- KEGG: D04064
- ChEMBL: ChEMBL1697792
- CompTox Dashboard (EPA): DTXSID3023001
- ECHA InfoCard: 100.023.272

Chemical and physical data
- Formula: C_{25}H_{36}O_{3}
- Molar mass: 384.560 g·mol^{−1}
- 3D model (JSmol): Interactive image
- SMILES: CCCCCCC(=O)O[C@H]1CC[C@@H]2[C@@]1(CC[C@H]3[C@H]2CCC4=C3C=CC(=C4)O)C
- InChI: InChI=1S/C25H36O3/c1-3-4-5-6-7-24(27)28-23-13-12-22-21-10-8-17-16-18(26)9-11-19(17)20(21)14-15-25(22,23)2/h9,11,16,20-23,26H,3-8,10,12-15H2,1-2H3/t20-,21-,22+,23+,25+/m1/s1; Key:RFWTZQAOOLFXAY-BZDYCCQFSA-N

Estradiol enanthate (EEn or E2-EN), also spelled estradiol enantate and sold under the brand names Perlutal and Topasel among others, is an estrogen medication which is used in hormonal birth control for women. It is formulated in combination with dihydroxyprogesterone acetophenide (DHPA; algestone acetophenide), a progestin, and is used specifically as a combined injectable contraceptive. Estradiol enanthate is not available for medical use alone. The medication, in combination with DHPA, is given by injection into muscle once a month.

Side effects of estradiol enanthate include breast tenderness, breast enlargement, nausea, headache, and fluid retention. Estradiol enanthate is an estrogen and hence is an agonist of the estrogen receptor, the biological target of estrogens like estradiol. It is an estrogen ester and a long-lasting prodrug of estradiol in the body. Because of this, it is considered to be a natural and bioidentical form of estrogen.

Estradiol enanthate was first described by 1954, and was first studied in combination with DHPA as a combined injectable contraceptive in 1964. The combination was introduced for clinical use by the mid-1970s. Estradiol enanthate is not available as a standalone medication (i.e., by itself without DHPA). The combination is available in Latin America and Hong Kong, and was also previously marketed in Spain and Portugal.

== Medical uses ==
Estradiol enanthate is used in combination with the progestin DHPA as a once-monthly combined injectable contraceptive for women in Latin America and Hong Kong. Estradiol enanthate has been studied in feminizing hormone therapy for transgender women as well. The combination of estradiol enanthate and DHPA has likewise been used by transgender women for such purposes. Since at least the 2020s, it has grown in popularity among the transfeminine community as a means of DIY hormone therapy (without DHPA).

=== Available forms ===
The following forms of estradiol enanthate are or have been available for use:

- Estradiol enanthate 10 mg and DHPA 150 mg (brand names Perlutal, Topasel, many others)
- Estradiol enanthate 5 mg and DHPA 75 mg (brand names Anafertin, Patector NF, Yectames)
- Estradiol enanthate 10 mg and DHPA 120 mg (brand names Unalmes, Yectuna)
- Estradiol enanthate 10 mg and DHPA 75 mg (brand name Ova Repos; discontinued)

A 6 mg estradiol enanthate and 90 mg DHPA formulation was also studied, but was never marketed. The combination of estradiol enanthate and DHPA has also been studied at other doses ranging from 5 to 50 mg estradiol enanthate and 75 to 200 mg DHPA.

The combination of estradiol enanthate and DHPA is provided in ampoules at estradiol enanthate concentrations of 5 mg/mL and 10 mg/mL.

== Contraindications ==
Contraindications of estrogens include coagulation problems, cardiovascular diseases, liver disease, and certain hormone-sensitive cancers such as breast cancer and endometrial cancer, among others.

== Side effects ==
The side effects of estradiol enanthate are the same as those of estradiol. Examples of such side effects include breast tenderness and enlargement, nausea, bloating, edema, headache, and melasma. The combination of estradiol enanthate and DHPA as a combined injectable contraceptive has shown no adverse effects on liver function, lipid metabolism, or coagulation.

A Brazilian case report of a prolactinoma in a transgender woman treated with 10 mg estradiol enanthate every 2 weeks exists. While DHPA was not mentioned in this instance, estradiol enanthate is normally formulated in combination with DHPA including in Brazil.

== Overdose ==
Symptoms of estrogen overdosage may include nausea, vomiting, bloating, increased weight, water retention, breast tenderness, vaginal discharge, heavy legs, and leg cramps. These side effects can be diminished by reducing the estrogen dosage.

== Interactions ==
Inhibitors and inducers of cytochrome P450 may influence the metabolism of estradiol and by extension circulating estradiol levels.

== Pharmacology ==
Estradiol, the active form of estradiol enanthate.

=== Pharmacodynamics ===
Estradiol enanthate is an estradiol ester, or a prodrug of estradiol. As such, it is an estrogen, or an agonist of the estrogen receptors. Estradiol enanthate is of about 41% higher molecular weight than estradiol due to the presence of its C17β enanthate ester. Because estradiol enanthate is a prodrug of estradiol, it is considered to be a natural and bioidentical form of estrogen.

The combination of 10 mg estradiol enanthate and 150 mg DHPA as a once-monthly combined injectable contraceptive (which achieves levels of estradiol of around 350 pg/mL) has been found to have little to no effect on many markers of estrogen-modulated liver protein synthesis, including circulating levels of HDL and LDL cholesterol, copper, ceruloplasmin, total and free cortisol, corticosteroid-binding globulin, and sex hormone-binding globulin. However, it was found to significantly increase levels of triglycerides and to significantly decrease levels of total and free testosterone. In contrast to the estradiol enanthate-containing combined injectable contraceptive, low-dose ethinylestradiol-containing birth control pills produce highly significant changes in all of the preceding parameters.

Studies in women and female capuchin monkeys have found that injections of estradiol enanthate and DHPA significantly alter levels of coagulation factors.

The clinical estrogenic effects of estradiol enanthate and ethinylestradiol have been compared in other studies as well.

Potencies and durations of natural estrogens by intramuscular injection
Estrogen	Form	Dose (mg)		Duration by dose (mg)
Estrogen	Form	EPD	CICD	Duration by dose (mg)
Estradiol	Aq. soln.	?	–	<1 d
Estradiol	Oil soln.	40–60	–	1–2 ≈ 1–2 d
Estradiol	Aq. susp.	?	3.5	0.5–2 ≈ 2–7 d; 3.5 ≈ >5 d
Estradiol	Microsph.	?	–	1 ≈ 30 d
Estradiol benzoate	Oil soln.	25–35	–	1.66 ≈ 2–3 d; 5 ≈ 3–6 d
Estradiol benzoate	Aq. susp.	20	–	10 ≈ 16–21 d
Estradiol benzoate	Emulsion	?	–	10 ≈ 14–21 d
Estradiol dipropionate	Oil soln.	25–30	–	5 ≈ 5–8 d
Estradiol valerate	Oil soln.	20–30	5	5 ≈ 7–8 d; 10 ≈ 10–14 d; 40 ≈ 14–21 d; 100 ≈ 21–28 d
Estradiol benz. butyrate	Oil soln.	?	10	10 ≈ 21 d
Estradiol cypionate	Oil soln.	20–30	–	5 ≈ 11–14 d
Estradiol cypionate	Aq. susp.	?	5	5 ≈ 14–24 d
Estradiol enanthate	Oil soln.	?	5–10	10 ≈ 20–30 d
Estradiol dienanthate	Oil soln.	?	–	7.5 ≈ >40 d
Estradiol undecylate	Oil soln.	?	–	10–20 ≈ 40–60 d; 25–50 ≈ 60–120 d
Polyestradiol phosphate	Aq. soln.	40–60	–	40 ≈ 30 d; 80 ≈ 60 d; 160 ≈ 120 d
Estrone	Oil soln.	?	–	1–2 ≈ 2–3 d
Estrone	Aq. susp.	?	–	0.1–2 ≈ 2–7 d
Estriol	Oil soln.	?	–	1–2 ≈ 1–4 d
Polyestriol phosphate	Aq. soln.	?	–	50 ≈ 30 d; 80 ≈ 60 d
Notes and sources Notes: All aqueous suspensions are of microcrystalline particle size. Estradiol production during the menstrual cycle is 30–640 µg/d (6.4–8.6 mg total per month or cycle). The vaginal epithelium maturation dosage of estradiol benzoate or estradiol valerate has been reported as 5 to 7 mg/week. An effective ovulation-inhibiting dose of estradiol undecylate is 20–30 mg/month. Sources: See template.

=== Pharmacokinetics ===
When estradiol enanthate is administered in an oil solution by intramuscular injection, a depot effect occurs, and this results in it having a long duration of action. The duration of action of estradiol enanthate is considerably longer than that of various other estradiol esters, such as estradiol benzoate and estradiol valerate, whereas its duration is shorter than that of estradiol undecylate. In general, the longer the fatty acid ester chain, the more lipophilic the estradiol ester, the more slowly it is released from the depot and absorbed into the circulation, and the longer its duration of action.

The pharmacokinetics of estradiol enanthate have been assessed in a number of studies. It has usually been studied in combination with DHPA. Following an intramuscular injection of estradiol enanthate, levels of estradiol have been found to peak after 3 to 8 days. Maximal levels of estradiol after a 5 mg injection of estradiol enanthate have been found to be about 163 to 209 pg/mL and after a 10 mg injection of estradiol enanthate have been found to be about 283 to 445 pg/mL. However, one outlying study reported peak estradiol levels of 850 pg/mL after an intramuscular injection of 10 mg estradiol enanthate in three postmenopausal women. It used radioimmunoassay for the determinations, with no mention of chromatographic separation. Estradiol levels following an intramuscular injection of 10 mg estradiol enanthate have been found to return to baseline levels of around 50 pg/mL after about 20 to 30 days. However, a metabolic study found that traces of radiolabeled estradiol enanthate remained detectable in blood for at least 30 to 40 days and for as long as 60 days. Studies have reported that the elimination half-life of estradiol enanthate after a single 10 mg intramuscular injection was 5.6 to 7.5 days. The volume of distribution of estradiol enanthate has been reported to be 5.087 L. Estradiol enanthate is excreted preferentially in urine.

There were concerns about possible accumulation of estradiol enanthate and consequent estrogenic overexposure with once-monthly combined injectable contraceptives containing the medication due its long duration, and this may have limited the use of such combined injectable contraceptives. Subsequent clinical studies have found that there is very limited or no accumulation of estradiol enanthate when it is used in once-a-month injectable contraceptives.

Hormone levels with estradiol enanthate by intramuscular injection
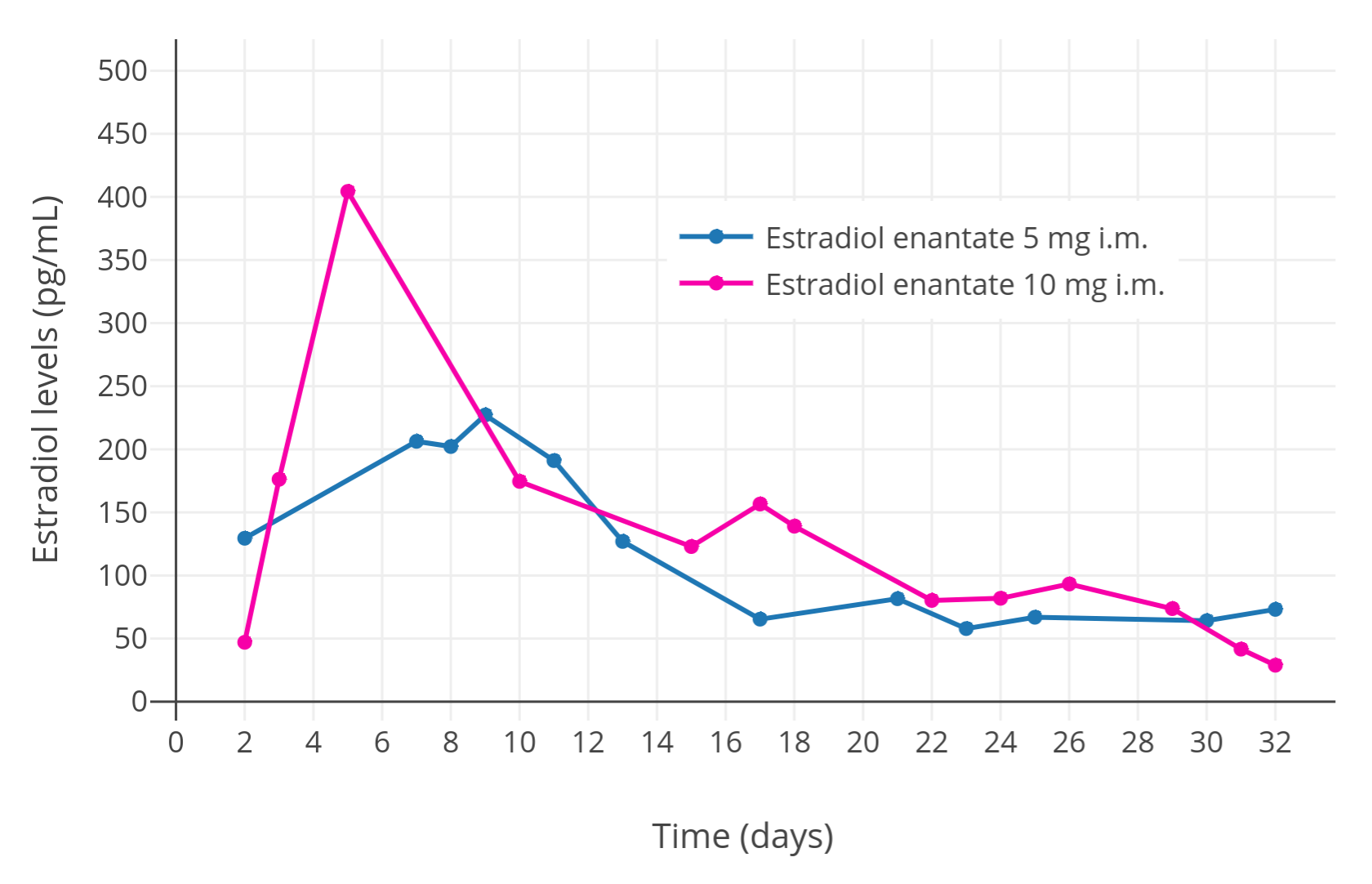
Estradiol levels after the most recent intramuscular injection during once-monthly 5 or 10 mg estradiol enanthate and 75 or 150 mg dihydroxyprogesterone acetophenide contraception in one premenopausal woman each. Assays were performed using radioimmunoassay. Source was Recio et al. (1986).

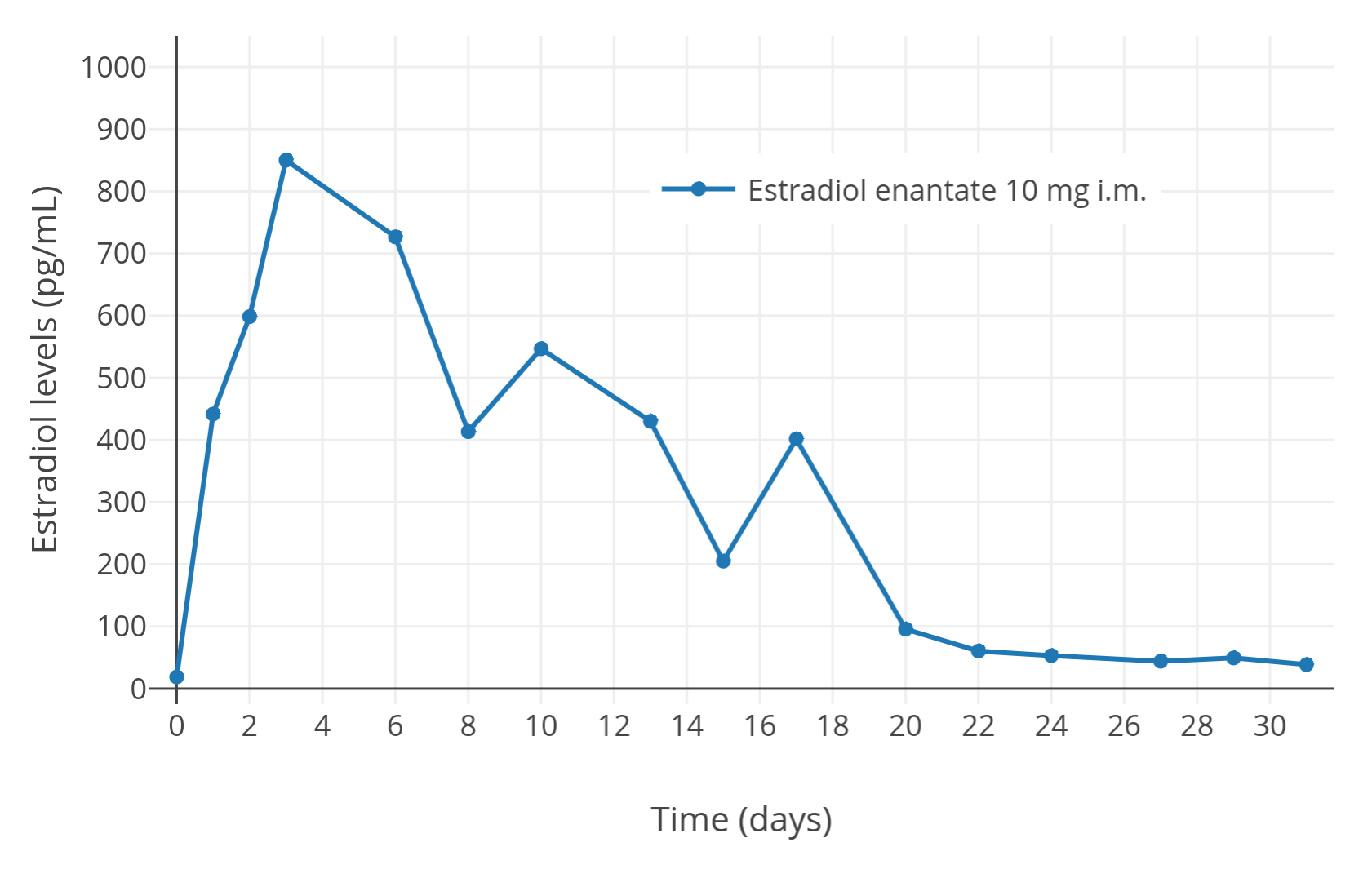
Estradiol levels after a single intramuscular injection of 10 mg estradiol enanthate in three postmenopausal women. Assays were performed using radioimmunoassay. Source was Wiemeyer et al. (1986).

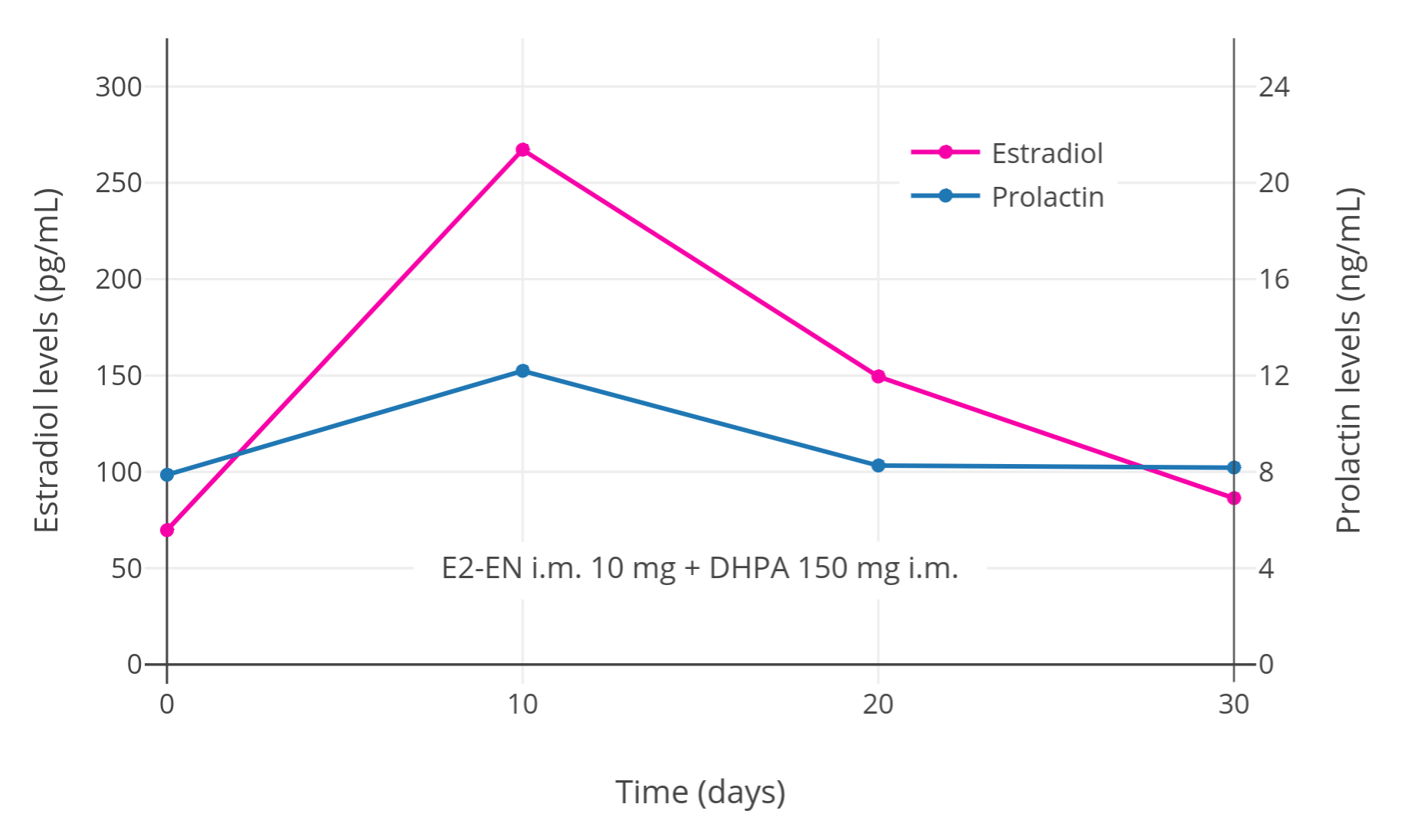
Estradiol and prolactin levels after the most recent intramuscular injection during once-monthly 10 mg estradiol enanthate and 150 mg dihydroxyprogesterone acetophenide contraception in 10 premenopausal women. Only four determinations were made: days 0, 10, 20, and 30. Assays were performed using radioimmunoassay. Source was Garza-Flores et al. (1989).

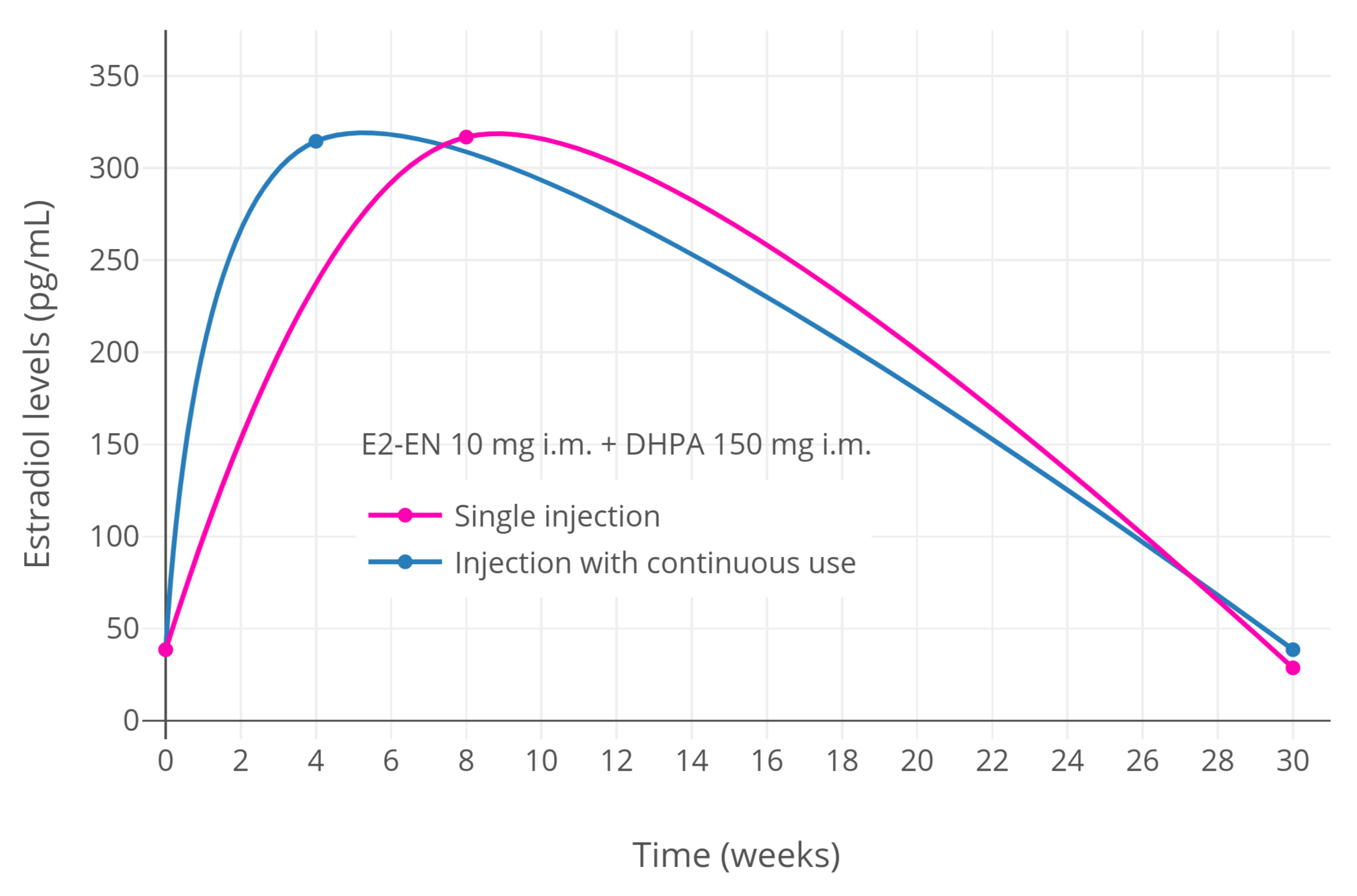
Simplified curves of estradiol levels after an intramuscular injection of 10 mg estradiol enanthate (E2-EN) and 150 mg dihydroxyprogesterone acetophenide (DHPA) in oil solution with single or continuous once-monthly use in women. Source was Garza-Flores (1994).

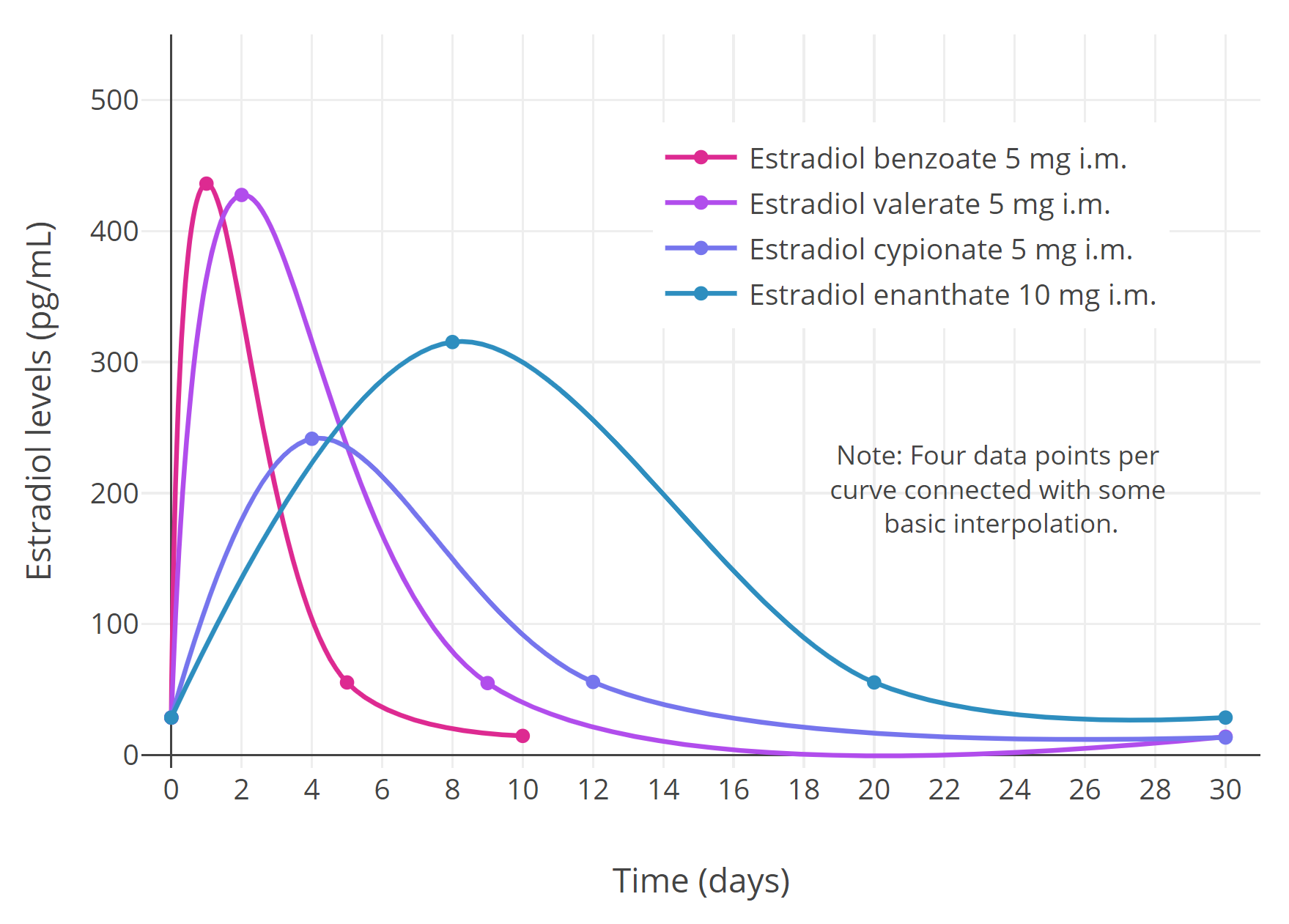
Simplified curves of estradiol levels after injection of different estradiol esters in women. Source was Garza-Flores (1994).

== Chemistry ==
Estradiol enanthate, also known as estradiol 17β-enanthate or estra-1,3,5(10)-triene-3,17β-diol 17β-heptanoate, is a synthetic estrane steroid and the C17β enanthate (heptanoate) fatty acid ester of estradiol. Other common esters of estradiol used clinically include estradiol benzoate, estradiol cypionate, estradiol undecylate, and estradiol valerate. Estradiol dienanthate (component of Climacteron), or estradiol 3,17β-dienanthate, has also been used.

The experimental octanol/water partition coefficient (logP) of estradiol enanthate is 6.7.

Structural properties of selected estradiol esters
Estrogen	Structure	Ester(s)				Relative mol. weight	Relative E2 content^{b}	log P^{c}
Estrogen	Structure	Position(s)	Moiet(ies)	Type	Length^{a}	Relative mol. weight	Relative E2 content^{b}	log P^{c}
Estradiol		–	–	–	–	1.00	1.00	4.0
Estradiol acetate		C3	Ethanoic acid	Straight-chain fatty acid	2	1.15	0.87	4.2
Estradiol benzoate		C3	Benzoic acid	Aromatic fatty acid	– (~4–5)	1.38	0.72	4.7
Estradiol dipropionate		C3, C17β	Propanoic acid (×2)	Straight-chain fatty acid	3 (×2)	1.41	0.71	4.9
Estradiol valerate		C17β	Pentanoic acid	Straight-chain fatty acid	5	1.31	0.76	5.6–6.3
Estradiol benzoate butyrate		C3, C17β	Benzoic acid, butyric acid	Mixed fatty acid	– (~6, 2)	1.64	0.61	6.3
Estradiol cypionate		C17β	Cyclopentylpropanoic acid	Cyclic fatty acid	– (~6)	1.46	0.69	6.9
Estradiol enanthate		C17β	Heptanoic acid	Straight-chain fatty acid	7	1.41	0.71	6.7–7.3
Estradiol dienanthate		C3, C17β	Heptanoic acid (×2)	Straight-chain fatty acid	7 (×2)	1.82	0.55	8.1–10.4
Estradiol undecylate		C17β	Undecanoic acid	Straight-chain fatty acid	11	1.62	0.62	9.2–9.8
Estradiol stearate		C17β	Octadecanoic acid	Straight-chain fatty acid	18	1.98	0.51	12.2–12.4
Estradiol distearate		C3, C17β	Octadecanoic acid (×2)	Straight-chain fatty acid	18 (×2)	2.96	0.34	20.2
Estradiol sulfate		C3	Sulfuric acid	Water-soluble conjugate	–	1.29	0.77	0.3–3.8
Estradiol glucuronide		C17β	Glucuronic acid	Water-soluble conjugate	–	1.65	0.61	2.1–2.7
Estramustine phosphate^{d}		C3, C17β	Normustine, phosphoric acid	Water-soluble conjugate	–	1.91	0.52	2.9–5.0
Polyestradiol phosphate^{e}		C3–C17β	Phosphoric acid	Water-soluble conjugate	–	1.23^{f}	0.81^{f}	2.9^{g}
Footnotes: ^{a} = Length of ester in carbon atoms for straight-chain fatty acids or approximate length of ester in carbon atoms for aromatic or cyclic fatty acids. ^{b} = Relative estradiol content by weight (i.e., relative estrogenic exposure). ^{c} = Experimental or predicted octanol/water partition coefficient (i.e., lipophilicity/hydrophobicity). Retrieved from PubChem, ChemSpider, and DrugBank. ^{d} = Also known as estradiol normustine phosphate. ^{e} = Polymer of estradiol phosphate (~13 repeat units). ^{f} = Relative molecular weight or estradiol content per repeat unit. ^{g} = log P of repeat unit (i.e., estradiol phosphate). Sources: See individual articles.

== History ==
Estradiol enanthate was first described, along with a variety of other estradiol esters, by Karl Junkmann of Schering AG in 1953. The first clinical study of estradiol enanthate and DHPA as a combined injectable contraceptive was conducted in 1964. The combination was marketed by the mid-1970s.

== Society and culture ==
=== Generic names ===
Estradiol enantate is the British English generic name of the medication and its INNM and BANM, while estradiol enanthate is its USAN and American English generic name. Its generic names in other languages are as follows:

- French: enantate d'estradiol and estradiol enantate
- German: estradiol enantat
- Italian: estradiolo enantato
- Portuguese and Spanish: enantato de estradiol and estradiol enantato

Estradiol enanthate is also known by its former developmental code name SQ-16150. It has been referred to as estradiol heptanoate.

=== Brand names ===
Estradiol enanthate has been marketed under a wide variety of brand names. It has been marketed in a few different preparations, with varying doses of estradiol enanthate and DHPA. These formulations all have different brand names, which include the following (^{†} = discontinued):

- EEn 10 mg / DHPA 150 mg: Acefil, Agurin^{†}, Atrimon^{†}, Ciclomes, Ciclovar, Ciclovular, Cicnor^{†}, Clinomin, Cycloven, Daiva, Damix, Deprans, Deproxone, Exuna, Ginestest, Ginoplan^{†}, Gynomes, Horprotal, Listen, Luvonal, Neogestar, Neolutin, Nomagest, Nonestrol, Normagest, Normensil, Novular, Oterol, Ovoginal, Patector, Patectro, Perludil, Perlumes, Perlutal, Perlutale, Perlutan, Perlutin, Perlutin-Unifarma, Permisil, Preg-Less, Pregnolan, Progestrol^{†}, Protegin, Proter, Seguralmes, Synovular, Topasel, Unigalen, Uno-Ciclo, and Vagital.
- EEn 10 mg / DHPA 120 mg: Anafertin^{†}, Patector NF, and Yectames.
- EEn 5 mg / DHPA 75 mg: Unalmes and Yectuna.
- EEn 10 mg / DHPA 75 mg: Ova Repos^{†}.
- Unsorted: Evitas^{†}, Femineo^{†}, and Primyfar^{†}.

The combination of EEn 10 mg and DHPA 150 mg was developed under the developmental brand name Deladroxate, but this brand name was never used commercially.

=== Availability ===
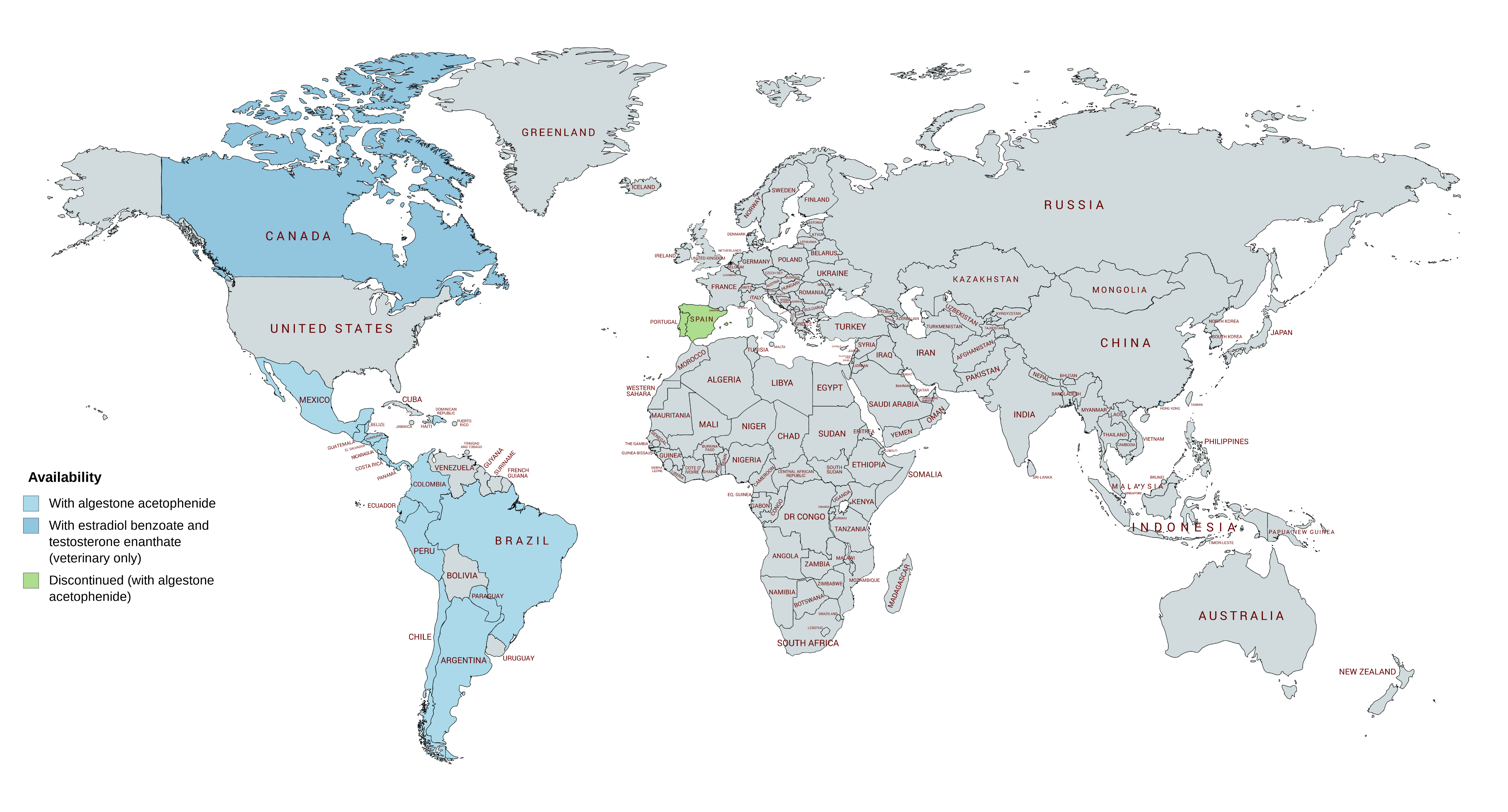
Known availability of estradiol enanthate in countries throughout the world (as of September 2018).

Estradiol enanthate has been marketed in combination with DHPA as a combined injectable contraceptive in at least 19 countries, mostly in Latin America. A few different preparations, with varying doses of EEn and DHPA and varying availability, have been introduced. These formulations have the following approval and availability (^{†} = discontinued in this country):

- EEn 10 mg / DHPA 150 mg: at least 19 countries, including Argentina, Belize, Brazil, Chile, Colombia, Costa Rica, the Dominican Republic, Ecuador, El Salvador, Guatemala, Honduras, Hong Kong, Mexico, Nicaragua, Panama, Paraguay, Peru, Portugal^{†}, and Spain^{†}.
- EEn 10 mg / DHPA 120 mg: at least 3 countries, including Brazil^{†}, Chile, and Paraguay.
- EEn 5 mg / DHPA 75 mg: at least 9 countries, including Costa Rica, the Dominican Republic, El Salvador, Guatemala, Honduras, Mexico, Nicaragua, Panama, and Spain^{†}.

EEn is also available in Canada in combination with estradiol benzoate and testosterone enanthate for veterinary use as Uni-Bol.

=== Usage ===
EEn/DHPA is the most widely used combined injectable contraceptive in Latin America. It was estimated in 1995 that EEn/DHPA was used as a combined injectable contraceptive in Latin America by at least 1 million women. However, combined injectable contraceptives like EEn/DHPA are unlikely to constitute a large proportion of total contraceptive use in the countries in which they are available.

== See also ==
- Estradiol enantate/algestone acetophenide
- Estradiol/estradiol enanthate
