= Estradiol acetate =

Chemical compound

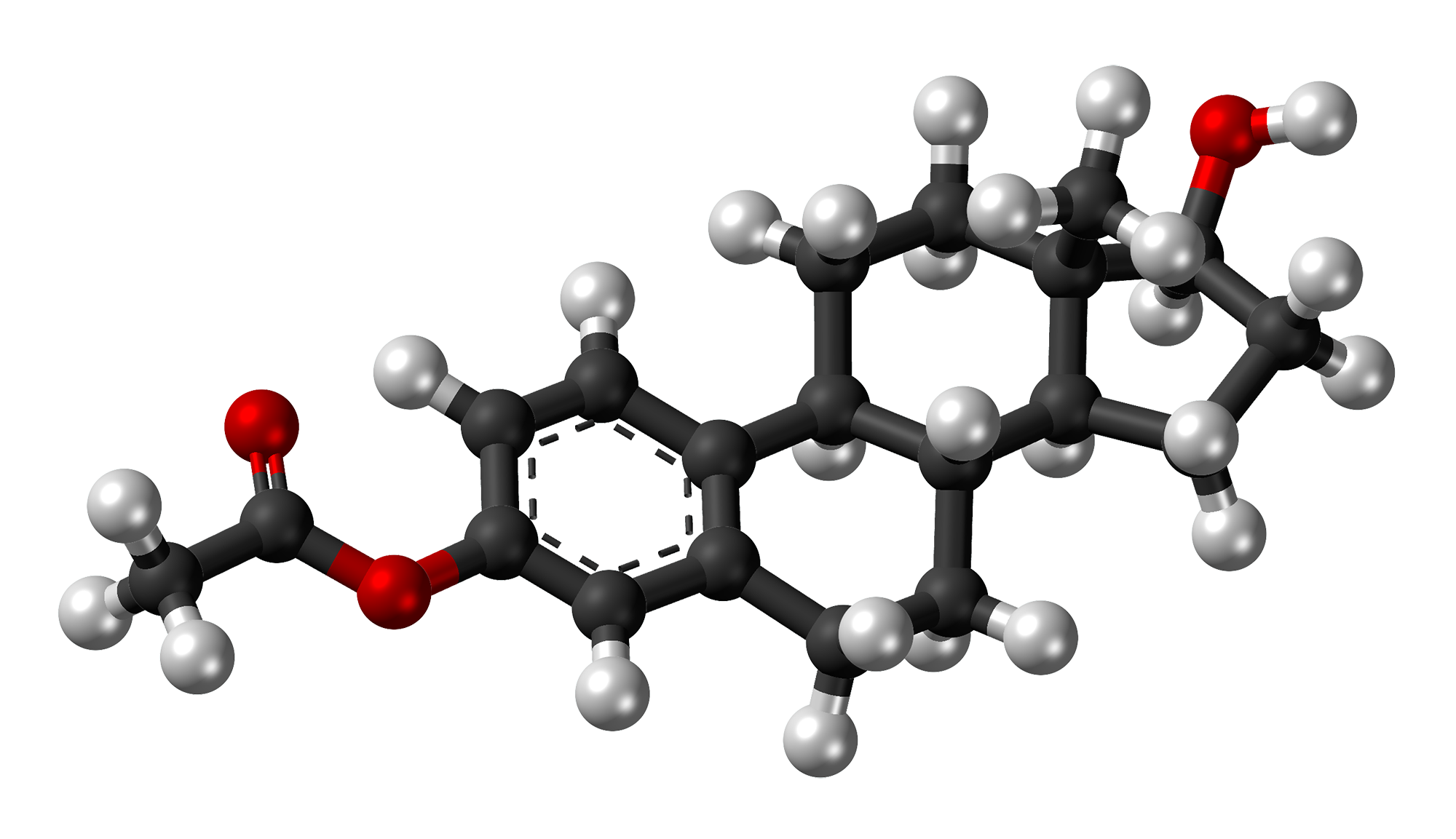

Clinical data
- Pronunciation: /ˌɛstrəˈdaɪoʊl ˈæsəteɪt/ ES-trə-DY-ohl ASS-ə-tayt
- Trade names: Femtrace, Femring, Menoring
- Other names: EA; E2A; E3A; Estradiol 3-acetate
- Routes of administration: By mouth, vaginal (ring)
- Drug class: Estrogen; Estrogen ester
- ATC code: G03CA03 (WHO)

Legal status
- Legal status: In general: ℞ (Prescription only)

Identifiers
- IUPAC name: [(8R,9S,13S,14S,17S)-17-hydroxy-13-methyl-6,7,8,9,11,12,14,15,16,17-decahydrocyclopenta[a]phenanthren-3-yl] acetate
- CAS Number: 4245-41-4
- PubChem CID: 9818306
- DrugBank: DB13952
- ChemSpider: 7994056
- UNII: 5R97F5H93P
- KEGG: D04061
- ChEMBL: ChEMBL1200430
- CompTox Dashboard (EPA): DTXSID7045867
- ECHA InfoCard: 100.167.088

Chemical and physical data
- Formula: C_{20}H_{26}O_{3}
- Molar mass: 314.425 g·mol^{−1}
- 3D model (JSmol): Interactive image
- SMILES: CC(=O)OC1=CC2=C(C=C1)[C@H]3CC[C@]4([C@H]([C@@H]3CC2)CC[C@@H]4O)C
- InChI: InChI=1S/C20H26O3/c1-12(21)23-14-4-6-15-13(11-14)3-5-17-16(15)9-10-20(2)18(17)7-8-19(20)22/h4,6,11,16-19,22H,3,5,7-10H2,1-2H3/t16-,17-,18+,19+,20+/m1/s1; Key:FHXBMXJMKMWVRG-SLHNCBLASA-N

Estradiol acetate (EA), sold under the brand names Femtrace, Femring, and Menoring, is an estrogen medication which is used in hormone therapy for the treatment of menopausal symptoms in women. It is taken by mouth once daily or given as a vaginal ring once every three months.

Side effects of estradiol acetate include breast tenderness, breast enlargement, nausea, headache, and fluid retention. Estradiol acetate is an estrogen and hence is an agonist of the estrogen receptor, the biological target of estrogens like estradiol. It is an estrogen ester and a prodrug of estradiol in the body. Because of this, it is considered to be a natural and bioidentical form of estrogen.

Estradiol acetate was introduced for medical use in 2001. It is available in the United States and the United Kingdom. The formulation for use by mouth has been discontinued in the United States.

== Medical uses ==
Estradiol acetate is used as a component of menopausal hormone therapy to treat and prevent menopausal symptoms such as hot flashes and osteoporosis in women.

The Women's Health Initiative studies report increased health risks for menopausal women when using unopposed estrogens. Estrogens with or without progestins should be prescribed at the lowest effective doses and for the shortest duration consistent with treatment goals and risks for the individual woman.

=== Available forms ===
Estradiol acetate comes in the form of 0.45, 0.9, and 1.8 mg oral tablets (Femtrace) and in the form of 12.4 or 24.8 mg vaginal rings that release 50 or 100 μg/day estradiol for 3 months (Femring, Menoring). However, the Femtrace product was discontinued in the United States.

== Contraindications ==
Contraindications of estrogens include coagulation problems, cardiovascular diseases, liver disease, and certain hormone-sensitive cancers such as breast cancer and endometrial cancer, among others.

== Side effects ==
The side effects of estradiol acetate are the same as those of estradiol. Examples of such side effects include breast tenderness and enlargement, nausea, bloating, edema, headache, and melasma.

== Overdose ==
Symptoms of estrogen overdosage may include nausea, vomiting, bloating, increased weight, water retention, breast tenderness, vaginal discharge, heavy legs, and leg cramps. These side effects can be diminished by reducing the estrogen dosage.

== Interactions ==
Inhibitors and inducers of cytochrome P450 may influence the metabolism of estradiol and by extension circulating estradiol levels.

== Pharmacology ==
Estradiol, the active form of estradiol acetate.

=== Pharmacodynamics ===
Estradiol acetate is an estradiol ester, or a prodrug of estradiol. As such, it is an estrogen, or an agonist of the estrogen receptors. Estradiol acetate is of about 15% higher molecular weight than estradiol due to the presence of its C3 acetate ester. Because estradiol acetate is a prodrug of estradiol, it is considered to be a natural and bioidentical form of estrogen.

=== Pharmacokinetics ===
Estradiol acetate is converted into estradiol in the body.

== Chemistry ==
Estradiol acetate is a synthetic estrane steroid and the C3 acetate ester of estradiol. It is also known as estradiol 3-acetate or as estra-1,3,5(10)-triene-3,17β-diol 3-acetate. Another common ester of estradiol in use for oral administration is estradiol valerate, which is a C17β ester of estradiol.

The experimental octanol/water partition coefficient (logP) of estradiol acetate is 4.2.

Structural properties of selected estradiol esters
Estrogen	Structure	Ester(s)				Relative mol. weight	Relative E2 content^{b}	log P^{c}
Estrogen	Structure	Position(s)	Moiet(ies)	Type	Length^{a}	Relative mol. weight	Relative E2 content^{b}	log P^{c}
Estradiol		–	–	–	–	1.00	1.00	4.0
Estradiol acetate		C3	Ethanoic acid	Straight-chain fatty acid	2	1.15	0.87	4.2
Estradiol benzoate		C3	Benzoic acid	Aromatic fatty acid	– (~4–5)	1.38	0.72	4.7
Estradiol dipropionate		C3, C17β	Propanoic acid (×2)	Straight-chain fatty acid	3 (×2)	1.41	0.71	4.9
Estradiol valerate		C17β	Pentanoic acid	Straight-chain fatty acid	5	1.31	0.76	5.6–6.3
Estradiol benzoate butyrate		C3, C17β	Benzoic acid, butyric acid	Mixed fatty acid	– (~6, 2)	1.64	0.61	6.3
Estradiol cypionate		C17β	Cyclopentylpropanoic acid	Cyclic fatty acid	– (~6)	1.46	0.69	6.9
Estradiol enanthate		C17β	Heptanoic acid	Straight-chain fatty acid	7	1.41	0.71	6.7–7.3
Estradiol dienanthate		C3, C17β	Heptanoic acid (×2)	Straight-chain fatty acid	7 (×2)	1.82	0.55	8.1–10.4
Estradiol undecylate		C17β	Undecanoic acid	Straight-chain fatty acid	11	1.62	0.62	9.2–9.8
Estradiol stearate		C17β	Octadecanoic acid	Straight-chain fatty acid	18	1.98	0.51	12.2–12.4
Estradiol distearate		C3, C17β	Octadecanoic acid (×2)	Straight-chain fatty acid	18 (×2)	2.96	0.34	20.2
Estradiol sulfate		C3	Sulfuric acid	Water-soluble conjugate	–	1.29	0.77	0.3–3.8
Estradiol glucuronide		C17β	Glucuronic acid	Water-soluble conjugate	–	1.65	0.61	2.1–2.7
Estramustine phosphate^{d}		C3, C17β	Normustine, phosphoric acid	Water-soluble conjugate	–	1.91	0.52	2.9–5.0
Polyestradiol phosphate^{e}		C3–C17β	Phosphoric acid	Water-soluble conjugate	–	1.23^{f}	0.81^{f}	2.9^{g}
Footnotes: ^{a} = Length of ester in carbon atoms for straight-chain fatty acids or approximate length of ester in carbon atoms for aromatic or cyclic fatty acids. ^{b} = Relative estradiol content by weight (i.e., relative estrogenic exposure). ^{c} = Experimental or predicted octanol/water partition coefficient (i.e., lipophilicity/hydrophobicity). Retrieved from PubChem, ChemSpider, and DrugBank. ^{d} = Also known as estradiol normustine phosphate. ^{e} = Polymer of estradiol phosphate (~13 repeat units). ^{f} = Relative molecular weight or estradiol content per repeat unit. ^{g} = log P of repeat unit (i.e., estradiol phosphate). Sources: See individual articles.

== History ==
Estradiol acetate is relatively recent to the market, having been first approved in a vaginal ring formulation as Menoring in the United Kingdom in 2001, followed by a vaginal ring formulation as Femring in the United States in 2002, and finally as an oral preparation as Femtrace in the United States in 2004.

== Society and culture ==
=== Generic names ===
Estradiol acetate is the generic name of the drug and its USAN.

=== Brand names ===
Estradiol acetate is marketed under the brand names Femtrace, Femring, and Menoring.

=== Availability ===
Estradiol acetate is available in the United States and the United Kingdom.
