= Estradiol phosphate =

Chemical compound

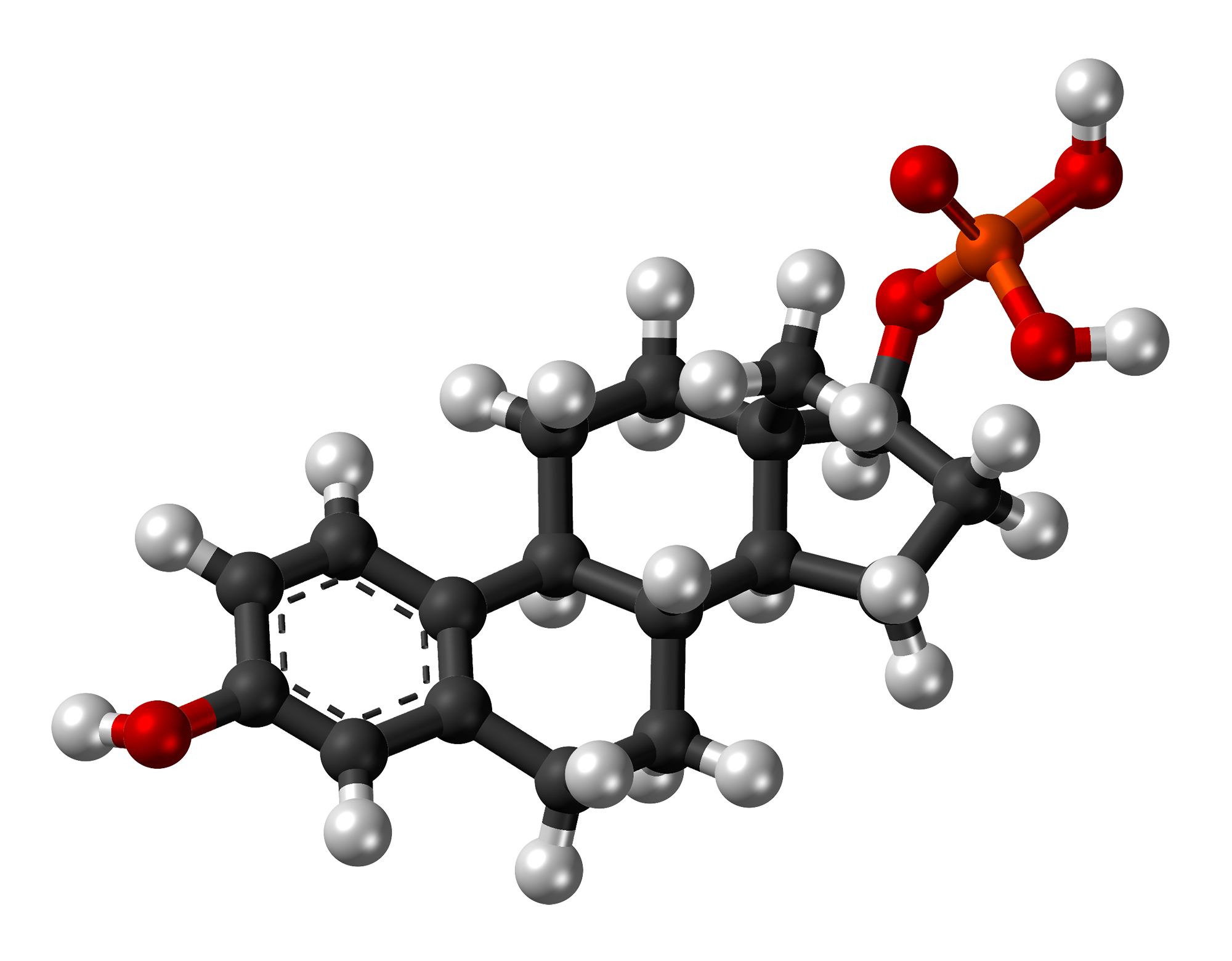

Clinical data
- Other names: Estradiol 17β-phosphate; Estra-1,3,5(10)-triene-3,17β-diol 17β-(dihydrogen phosphate); 3-Hydroxyestra-1,3,5(10)-trien-17β-yl phosphate
- Drug class: Estrogen; Estrogen ester

Identifiers
- IUPAC name: [(8R,9S,13S,14S,17S)-3-hydroxy-13-methyl-6,7,8,9,11,12,14,15,16,17-decahydrocyclopenta[a]phenanthren-17-yl] dihydrogen phosphate
- CAS Number: 4995-43-1
- PubChem CID: 66435
- ChemSpider: 10043883
- UNII: SKL7PDP588
- ChEMBL: ChEMBL1642763
- CompTox Dashboard (EPA): DTXSID6045086

Chemical and physical data
- Formula: C_{18}H_{25}O_{5}P
- Molar mass: 352.367 g·mol^{−1}
- 3D model (JSmol): Interactive image
- SMILES: Oc1ccc2[C@H]3CC[C@]4(C)[C@]5(CC[C@H]4[C@@H]3CCc2c1).O5P(O)(=O)O
- InChI: InChI=1S/C18H25O5P/c1-18-9-8-14-13-5-3-12(19)10-11(13)2-4-15(14)16(18)6-7-17(18)23-24(20,21)22/h3,5,10,14-17,19H,2,4,6-9H2,1H3,(H2,20,21,22)/t14-,15-,16+,17+,18+/m1/s1; Key:BBWXLCKRYRQQPL-ZBRFXRBCSA-N

Estradiol phosphate, or estradiol 17β-phosphate, also known as estra-1,3,5(10)-triene-3,17β-diol 17β-(dihydrogen phosphate), is an estrogen which was never marketed. It is an estrogen ester, specifically an ester of estradiol with phosphoric acid, and acts as a prodrug of estradiol in the body. It is rapidly cleaved by phosphatase enzymes into estradiol upon administration. Estradiol phosphate is contained within the chemical structures of two other estradiol esters, polyestradiol phosphate (a polymer of estradiol phosphate) and estramustine phosphate (estradiol 3-normustine 17β-phosphate), both of which have been marketed for the treatment of prostate cancer.

Structural properties of selected estradiol esters
Estrogen	Structure	Ester(s)				Relative mol. weight	Relative E2 content^{b}	log P^{c}
Estrogen	Structure	Position(s)	Moiet(ies)	Type	Length^{a}	Relative mol. weight	Relative E2 content^{b}	log P^{c}
Estradiol		–	–	–	–	1.00	1.00	4.0
Estradiol acetate		C3	Ethanoic acid	Straight-chain fatty acid	2	1.15	0.87	4.2
Estradiol benzoate		C3	Benzoic acid	Aromatic fatty acid	– (~4–5)	1.38	0.72	4.7
Estradiol dipropionate		C3, C17β	Propanoic acid (×2)	Straight-chain fatty acid	3 (×2)	1.41	0.71	4.9
Estradiol valerate		C17β	Pentanoic acid	Straight-chain fatty acid	5	1.31	0.76	5.6–6.3
Estradiol benzoate butyrate		C3, C17β	Benzoic acid, butyric acid	Mixed fatty acid	– (~6, 2)	1.64	0.61	6.3
Estradiol cypionate		C17β	Cyclopentylpropanoic acid	Cyclic fatty acid	– (~6)	1.46	0.69	6.9
Estradiol enanthate		C17β	Heptanoic acid	Straight-chain fatty acid	7	1.41	0.71	6.7–7.3
Estradiol dienanthate		C3, C17β	Heptanoic acid (×2)	Straight-chain fatty acid	7 (×2)	1.82	0.55	8.1–10.4
Estradiol undecylate		C17β	Undecanoic acid	Straight-chain fatty acid	11	1.62	0.62	9.2–9.8
Estradiol stearate		C17β	Octadecanoic acid	Straight-chain fatty acid	18	1.98	0.51	12.2–12.4
Estradiol distearate		C3, C17β	Octadecanoic acid (×2)	Straight-chain fatty acid	18 (×2)	2.96	0.34	20.2
Estradiol sulfate		C3	Sulfuric acid	Water-soluble conjugate	–	1.29	0.77	0.3–3.8
Estradiol glucuronide		C17β	Glucuronic acid	Water-soluble conjugate	–	1.65	0.61	2.1–2.7
Estramustine phosphate^{d}		C3, C17β	Normustine, phosphoric acid	Water-soluble conjugate	–	1.91	0.52	2.9–5.0
Polyestradiol phosphate^{e}		C3–C17β	Phosphoric acid	Water-soluble conjugate	–	1.23^{f}	0.81^{f}	2.9^{g}
Footnotes: ^{a} = Length of ester in carbon atoms for straight-chain fatty acids or approximate length of ester in carbon atoms for aromatic or cyclic fatty acids. ^{b} = Relative estradiol content by weight (i.e., relative estrogenic exposure). ^{c} = Experimental or predicted octanol/water partition coefficient (i.e., lipophilicity/hydrophobicity). Retrieved from PubChem, ChemSpider, and DrugBank. ^{d} = Also known as estradiol normustine phosphate. ^{e} = Polymer of estradiol phosphate (~13 repeat units). ^{f} = Relative molecular weight or estradiol content per repeat unit. ^{g} = log P of repeat unit (i.e., estradiol phosphate). Sources: See individual articles.

== See also ==
- List of estrogen esters § Estradiol esters
