= Estradiol benzoate/estradiol dienanthate/testosterone enanthate benzilic acid hydrazone =

Combination drug

EB/EDE/TEBH
Combination of
- Estradiol benzoate: Estrogen
- Estradiol dienanthate: Estrogen
- Testosterone enanthate benzilic acid hydrazone: Androgen; Anabolic steroid

Clinical data
- Trade names: Climacteron, Lactimex, Lactostat, Amenose
- Other names: EB/EDE/TEBH
- Routes of administration: Intramuscular injection

Identifiers
- CAS Number: 8063-58-9
- PubChem CID: 9577491

Estradiol benzoate/estradiol dienanthate/testosterone enanthate benzilic acid hydrazone (EB/EDE/TEBH), sold under the brand names Climacteron, Lactimex, Lactostat, and Amenose, is an injectable combination medication of estradiol benzoate (EB), an estrogen, estradiol dienanthate (EDE), an estrogen, and testosterone enanthate benzilic acid hydrazone (TEBH), an androgen/anabolic steroid, which is used in menopausal hormone therapy for peri- and postmenopausal women and to suppress lactation in postpartum women. Clinical studies have assessed this formulation.

Climacteron and Amenose contained 1.0 mg EB, 7.5 mg EDE, and 150 mg TEBH (69 mg free testosterone) and was used to treat menopausal symptoms. They were administered by intramuscular injection typically once every 6 weeks but with a range of every 4 to 8 weeks or less frequently. Climacteron was marketed in Canada in 1961 but was withdrawn in this country in October 2005 due to risk of endometrial hyperplasia and cancer from unopposed estrogen exposure (i.e., no concomitant progestogen) as well as induction of supraphysiological testosterone levels.

Lactimex and Lactostat contained 6 mg EB, 15 mg EDE, and 300 mg TEBH in 2 mL of corn oil and were used to suppress lactation. They were administered as a single intramuscular injection after childbirth or during breastfeeding. They were previously available in Germany and Canada.

Estradiol and testosterone levels following a single intramuscular injection of EB/EDE/TEBH versus 10 mg estradiol valerate have been studied over 28 days.

Androgen replacement therapy formulations and dosages used in women
| Route | Medication | Major brand names | Form | Dosage |
|---|---|---|---|---|
| Oral | Testosterone undecanoate | Andriol, Jatenzo | Capsule | 40–80 mg 1x/1–2 days |
| Oral | Methyltestosterone | Metandren, Estratest | Tablet | 0.5–10 mg/day |
| Oral | Fluoxymesterone | Halotestin | Tablet | 1–2.5 mg 1x/1–2 days |
| Oral | Normethandrone^{a} | Ginecoside | Tablet | 5 mg/day |
| Oral | Tibolone | Livial | Tablet | 1.25–2.5 mg/day |
| Oral | Prasterone (DHEA)^{b} | – | Tablet | 10–100 mg/day |
| Sublingual | Methyltestosterone | Metandren | Tablet | 0.25 mg/day |
| Transdermal | Testosterone | Intrinsa | Patch | 150–300 μg/day |
| Transdermal | Testosterone | AndroGel | Gel, cream | 1–10 mg/day |
| Vaginal | Prasterone (DHEA) | Intrarosa | Insert | 6.5 mg/day |
| Injection | Testosterone propionate^{a} | Testoviron | Oil solution | 25 mg 1x/1–2 weeks |
| Injection | Testosterone enanthate | Delatestryl, Primodian Depot | Oil solution | 25–100 mg 1x/4–6 weeks |
| Injection | Testosterone cypionate | Depo-Testosterone, Depo-Testadiol | Oil solution | 25–100 mg 1x/4–6 weeks |
| Injection | Testosterone isobutyrate^{a} | Femandren M, Folivirin | Aqueous suspension | 25–50 mg 1x/4–6 weeks |
| Injection | Mixed testosterone esters | Climacteron^{a} | Oil solution | 150 mg 1x/4–8 weeks |
| Injection | Mixed testosterone esters | Omnadren, Sustanon | Oil solution | 50–100 mg 1x/4–6 weeks |
| Injection | Nandrolone decanoate | Deca-Durabolin | Oil solution | 25–50 mg 1x/6–12 weeks |
| Injection | Prasterone enanthate^{a} | Gynodian Depot | Oil solution | 200 mg 1x/4–6 weeks |
| Implant | Testosterone | Testopel | Pellet | 50–100 mg 1x/3–6 months |
Notes: Premenopausal women produce about 230 ± 70 μg testosterone per day (6.4 ± 2.0 mg testosterone per 4 weeks), with a range of 130 to 330 μg per day (3.6–9.2 mg per 4 weeks). Footnotes: ^{a} = Mostly discontinued or unavailable. ^{b} = Over-the-counter. Sources: See template.

Potencies and durations of natural estrogens by intramuscular injection
| Estrogen | Form | Dose (mg) | | Duration by dose (mg) |
| Estrogen | Form | EPD | CICD | Duration by dose (mg) |
|---|---|---|---|---|
| Estradiol | Aq. soln. | ? | – | <1 d |
| Estradiol | Oil soln. | 40–60 | – | 1–2 ≈ 1–2 d |
| Estradiol | Aq. susp. | ? | 3.5 | 0.5–2 ≈ 2–7 d; 3.5 ≈ >5 d |
| Estradiol | Microsph. | ? | – | 1 ≈ 30 d |
| Estradiol benzoate | Oil soln. | 25–35 | – | 1.66 ≈ 2–3 d; 5 ≈ 3–6 d |
| Estradiol benzoate | Aq. susp. | 20 | – | 10 ≈ 16–21 d |
| Estradiol benzoate | Emulsion | ? | – | 10 ≈ 14–21 d |
| Estradiol dipropionate | Oil soln. | 25–30 | – | 5 ≈ 5–8 d |
| Estradiol valerate | Oil soln. | 20–30 | 5 | 5 ≈ 7–8 d; 10 ≈ 10–14 d; 40 ≈ 14–21 d; 100 ≈ 21–28 d |
| Estradiol benz. butyrate | Oil soln. | ? | 10 | 10 ≈ 21 d |
| Estradiol cypionate | Oil soln. | 20–30 | – | 5 ≈ 11–14 d |
| Estradiol cypionate | Aq. susp. | ? | 5 | 5 ≈ 14–24 d |
| Estradiol enanthate | Oil soln. | ? | 5–10 | 10 ≈ 20–30 d |
| Estradiol dienanthate | Oil soln. | ? | – | 7.5 ≈ >40 d |
| Estradiol undecylate | Oil soln. | ? | – | 10–20 ≈ 40–60 d; 25–50 ≈ 60–120 d |
| Polyestradiol phosphate | Aq. soln. | 40–60 | – | 40 ≈ 30 d; 80 ≈ 60 d; 160 ≈ 120 d |
| Estrone | Oil soln. | ? | – | 1–2 ≈ 2–3 d |
| Estrone | Aq. susp. | ? | – | 0.1–2 ≈ 2–7 d |
| Estriol | Oil soln. | ? | – | 1–2 ≈ 1–4 d |
| Polyestriol phosphate | Aq. soln. | ? | – | 50 ≈ 30 d; 80 ≈ 60 d |
Notes and sources Notes: All aqueous suspensions are of microcrystalline particle size. Estradiol production during the menstrual cycle is 30–640 µg/d (6.4–8.6 mg total per month or cycle). The vaginal epithelium maturation dosage of estradiol benzoate or estradiol valerate has been reported as 5 to 7 mg/week. An effective ovulation-inhibiting dose of estradiol undecylate is 20–30 mg/month. Sources: See template.

Hormone levels with estradiol benzoate/estradiol dienanthate/testosterone enanthate benzilic acid hydrazone by intramuscular injection
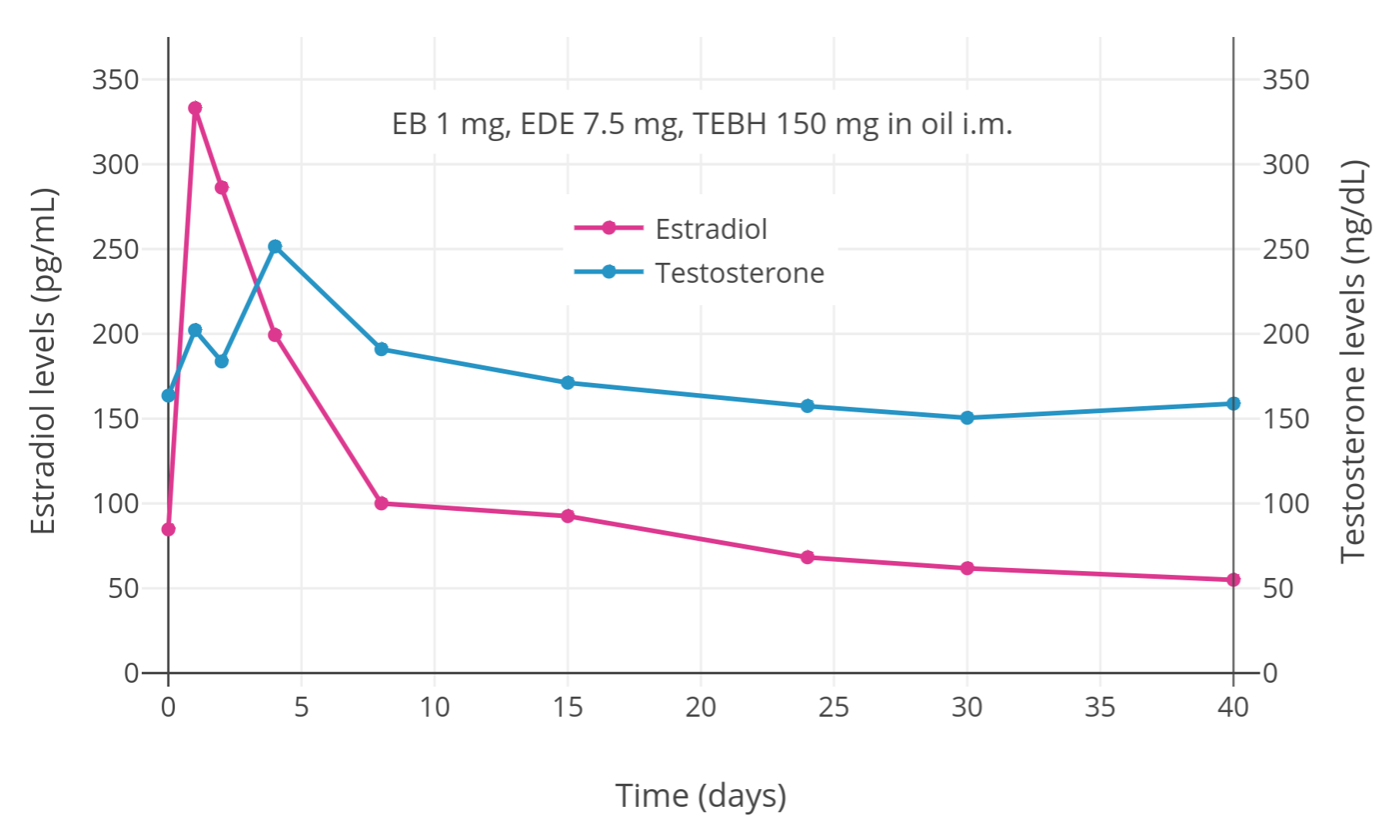
Estradiol and testosterone levels after an intramuscular injection of 1 mg estradiol benzoate, 7.5 mg estradiol dienanthate, and 150 mg testosterone enanthate benzilic acid hydrazone in oil (brand name Climacteron) in ovariectomized women. Assays were performed using immunoassays. Source was Sherwin (1987).

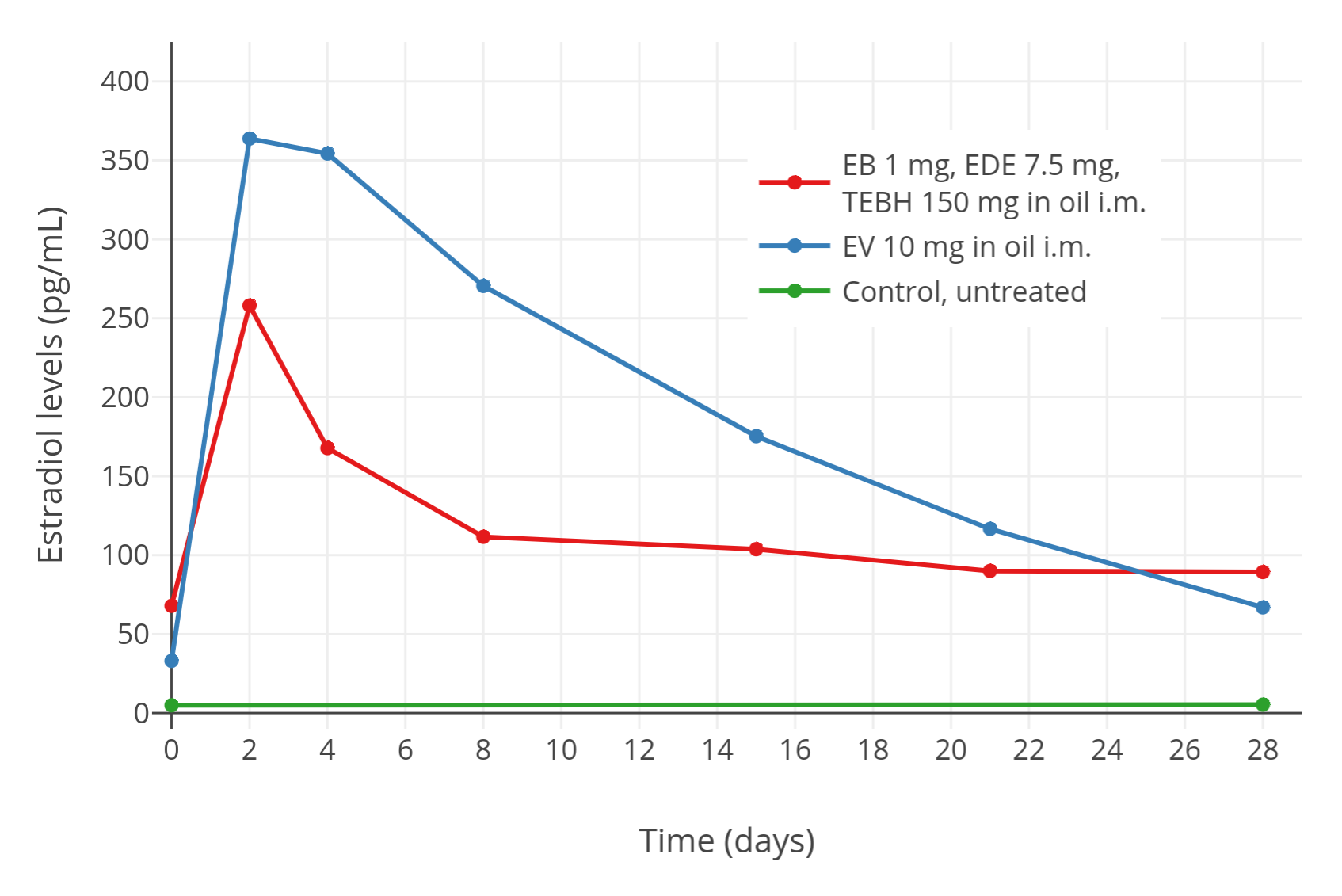
Estradiol levels after an intramuscular injection of 10 mg estradiol valerate in oil or Climacteron (1 mg estradiol benzoate, 7.5 mg estradiol dienanthate in oil) in ovariectomized women. Assays were performed using RIA. Source was Sherwin et al. (1987).

== See also ==
- List of combined sex-hormonal preparations
