= Estradiol dienantate =

Chemical compound

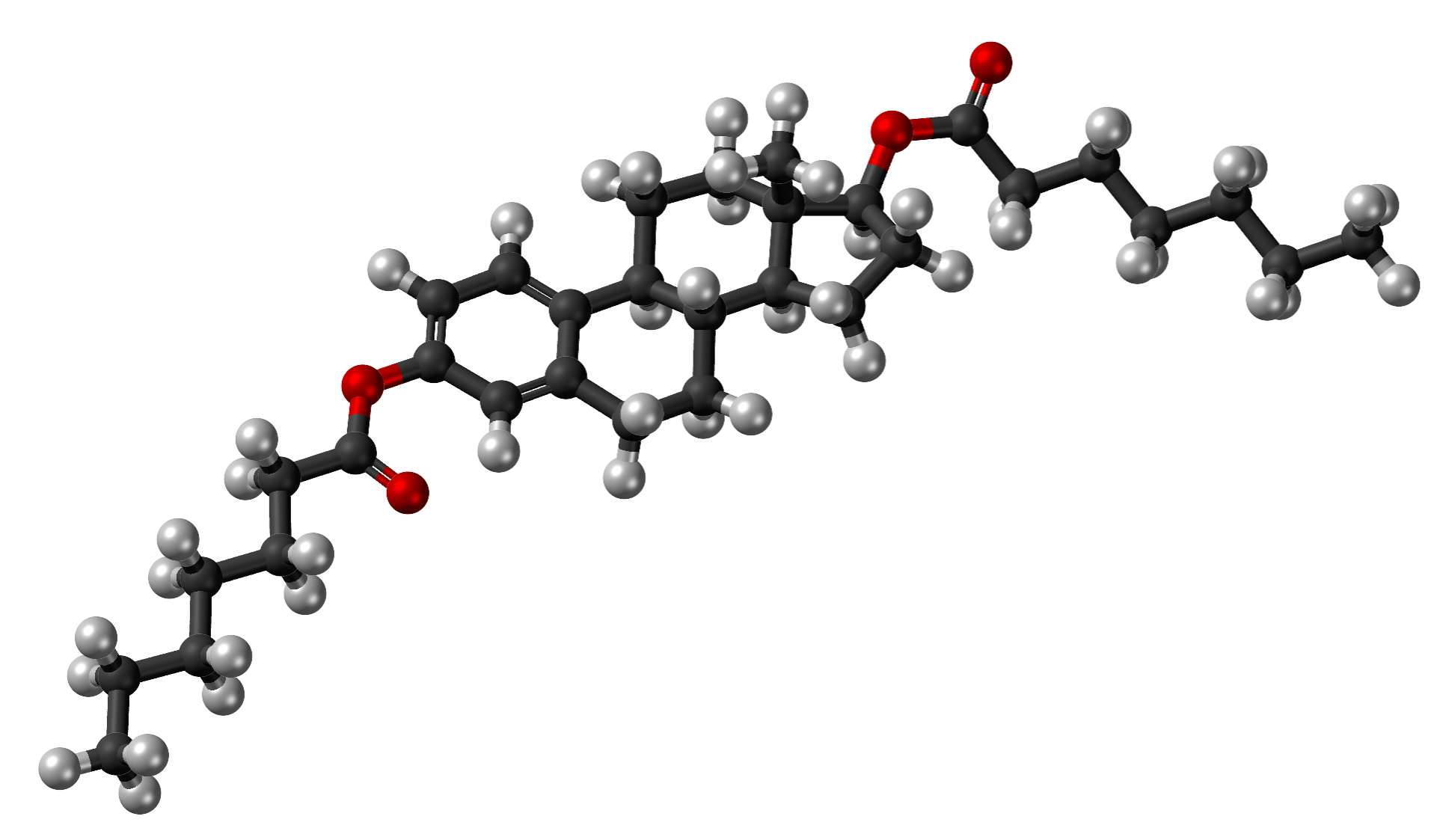

Clinical data
- Trade names: Climacteron, Amenose, Lactimex, Lactostat (all combinations)
- Other names: Estradiol dienantate; EDE; EDEn; E2-EDN; Estradiol diheptanoate; Estra-1,3,5(10)-triene-3,17β-diol 3,17β-diheptanoate
- Routes of administration: Intramuscular injection
- Drug class: Estrogen; Estrogen ester

Identifiers
- IUPAC name: [(8R,9S,13S,14S,17S)-3-heptanoyloxy-13-methyl-6,7,8,9,11,12,14,15,16,17-decahydrocyclopenta[a]phenanthren-17-yl] heptanoate
- CAS Number: 7732-97-0
- PubChem CID: 165688
- DrugBank: DB13955
- ChemSpider: 145199
- UNII: 65C72P1860
- CompTox Dashboard (EPA): DTXSID401024596
- ECHA InfoCard: 100.028.903

Chemical and physical data
- Formula: C_{32}H_{48}O_{4}
- Molar mass: 496.732 g·mol^{−1}
- 3D model (JSmol): Interactive image
- SMILES: CCCCCCC(=O)O[C@H]1CC[C@@H]2[C@@]1(CC[C@H]3[C@H]2CCC4=C3C=CC(=C4)OC(=O)CCCCCC)C
- InChI: InChI=1S/C32H48O4/c1-4-6-8-10-12-30(33)35-24-15-17-25-23(22-24)14-16-27-26(25)20-21-32(3)28(27)18-19-29(32)36-31(34)13-11-9-7-5-2/h15,17,22,26-29H,4-14,16,18-21H2,1-3H3/t26-,27-,28+,29+,32+/m1/s1; Key:OVAHZPTYWMWNKO-CAHAWPIUSA-N

Estradiol dienanthate (EDE), sold under the brand names Climacteron among others, is a long-acting estrogen medication which was previously used in menopausal hormone therapy for women and to suppress lactation in women. It was formulated in combination with estradiol benzoate (EB), a short-acting estrogen, and testosterone enanthate benzilic acid hydrazone (TEBH), a long-acting androgen/anabolic steroid. EDE has not been made available for medical use alone. The medication, in combination with EB and TEBH, was given by injection into muscle once or at regular intervals, for instance once every 6 weeks.

Side effects of EDE include breast tenderness, breast enlargement, nausea, headache, and fluid retention. EDE is an estrogen and hence is an agonist of the estrogen receptor, the biological target of estrogens like estradiol. It is an estrogen ester and a prodrug of estradiol in the body. Because of this, it is considered to be a natural and bioidentical form of estrogen.

EDE was first described by 1959. It was previously available in Canada and Germany but was discontinued by 2005. The medication is no longer available in any form.

== Medical uses ==
EDE, a long-acting estrogen, was used in combination with EB, a short-acting estrogen, and TEBH, a long-acting androgen/anabolic steroid, in menopausal hormone therapy in perimenopausal, postmenopausal, hypogonadal, and oophorectomized women, as well as for suppression of lactation in postpartum women.

=== Available forms ===
EDE was available only in combination EB and TEBH. The combination was available in two different dose forms, one for menopausal hormone therapy (brand names Climacteron, Amenose) and the other for lactation suppression (brand names Lactimex, Lactostat). Climacteron and Amenose contained 1.0 mg EB, 7.5 mg EDE, and 150 mg TEBH (69 mg free testosterone) and was given by repeated intramuscular injection at regular intervals. Lactimex and Lactostat contained 6 mg EB, 15 mg EDE, and 300 mg TEBH in 2 mL of corn oil and was administered as a single intramuscular injection after childbirth or during breastfeeding.

== Pharmacology ==
Estradiol, the active form of EDE.

=== Pharmacodynamics ===
EDE is an estradiol ester, or a prodrug of estradiol. As such, it is an estrogen, or an agonist of the estrogen receptors. EDE is of about 82% higher molecular weight than estradiol due to the presence of its C3 and C17β heptanoate (enanthate) esters. Because EDE is a prodrug of estradiol, it is considered to be a natural and bioidentical form of estrogen.

Potencies and durations of natural estrogens by intramuscular injection
Estrogen	Form	Dose (mg)		Duration by dose (mg)
Estrogen	Form	EPD	CICD	Duration by dose (mg)
Estradiol	Aq. soln.	?	–	<1 d
Estradiol	Oil soln.	40–60	–	1–2 ≈ 1–2 d
Estradiol	Aq. susp.	?	3.5	0.5–2 ≈ 2–7 d; 3.5 ≈ >5 d
Estradiol	Microsph.	?	–	1 ≈ 30 d
Estradiol benzoate	Oil soln.	25–35	–	1.66 ≈ 2–3 d; 5 ≈ 3–6 d
Estradiol benzoate	Aq. susp.	20	–	10 ≈ 16–21 d
Estradiol benzoate	Emulsion	?	–	10 ≈ 14–21 d
Estradiol dipropionate	Oil soln.	25–30	–	5 ≈ 5–8 d
Estradiol valerate	Oil soln.	20–30	5	5 ≈ 7–8 d; 10 ≈ 10–14 d; 40 ≈ 14–21 d; 100 ≈ 21–28 d
Estradiol benz. butyrate	Oil soln.	?	10	10 ≈ 21 d
Estradiol cypionate	Oil soln.	20–30	–	5 ≈ 11–14 d
Estradiol cypionate	Aq. susp.	?	5	5 ≈ 14–24 d
Estradiol enanthate	Oil soln.	?	5–10	10 ≈ 20–30 d
Estradiol dienanthate	Oil soln.	?	–	7.5 ≈ >40 d
Estradiol undecylate	Oil soln.	?	–	10–20 ≈ 40–60 d; 25–50 ≈ 60–120 d
Polyestradiol phosphate	Aq. soln.	40–60	–	40 ≈ 30 d; 80 ≈ 60 d; 160 ≈ 120 d
Estrone	Oil soln.	?	–	1–2 ≈ 2–3 d
Estrone	Aq. susp.	?	–	0.1–2 ≈ 2–7 d
Estriol	Oil soln.	?	–	1–2 ≈ 1–4 d
Polyestriol phosphate	Aq. soln.	?	–	50 ≈ 30 d; 80 ≈ 60 d
Notes and sources Notes: All aqueous suspensions are of microcrystalline particle size. Estradiol production during the menstrual cycle is 30–640 µg/d (6.4–8.6 mg total per month or cycle). The vaginal epithelium maturation dosage of estradiol benzoate or estradiol valerate has been reported as 5 to 7 mg/week. An effective ovulation-inhibiting dose of estradiol undecylate is 20–30 mg/month. Sources: See template.

Hormone levels with estradiol benzoate/estradiol dienanthate/testosterone enanthate benzilic acid hydrazone by intramuscular injection
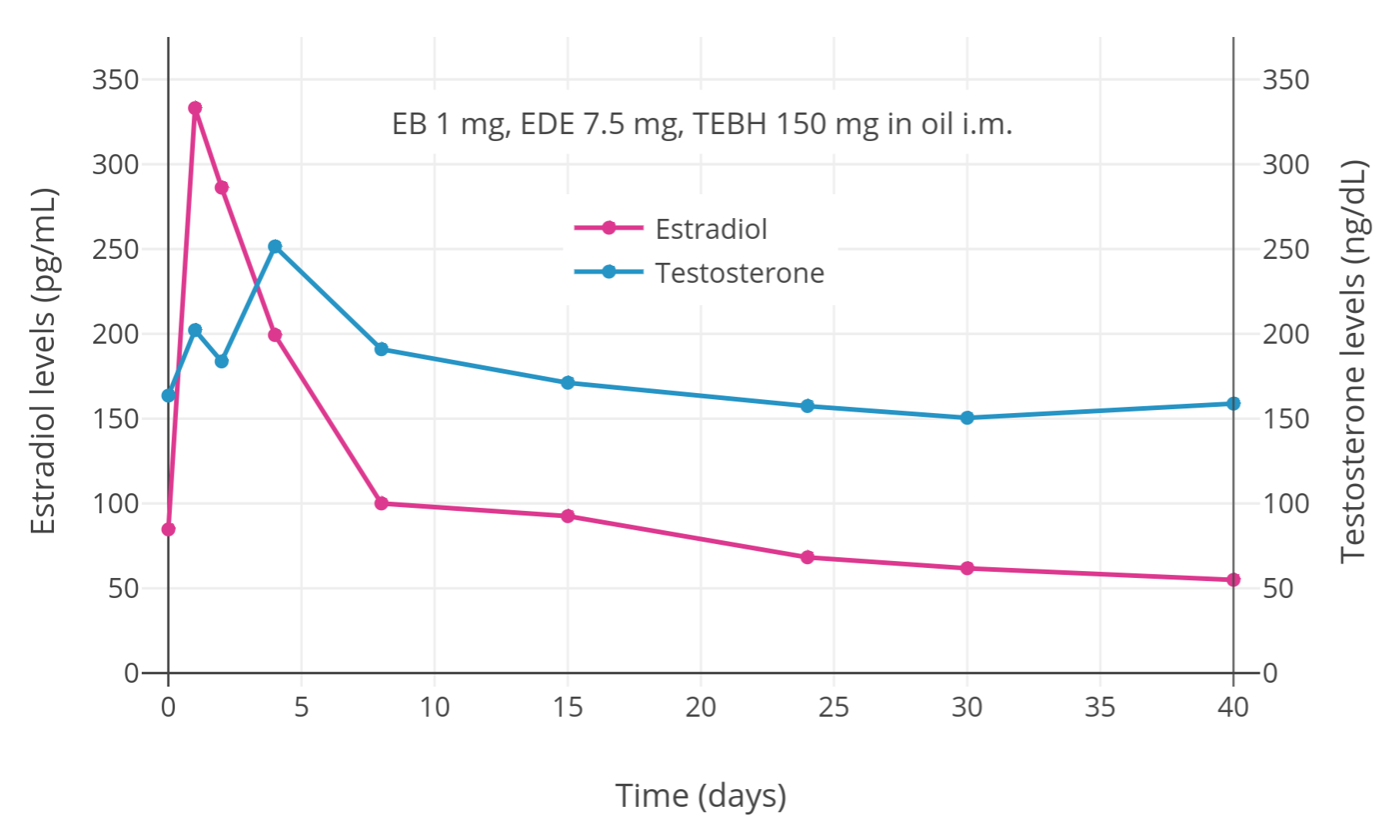
Estradiol and testosterone levels after an intramuscular injection of 1 mg estradiol benzoate, 7.5 mg estradiol dienanthate, and 150 mg testosterone enanthate benzilic acid hydrazone in oil (brand name Climacteron) in ovariectomized women. Assays were performed using immunoassays. Source was Sherwin (1987).

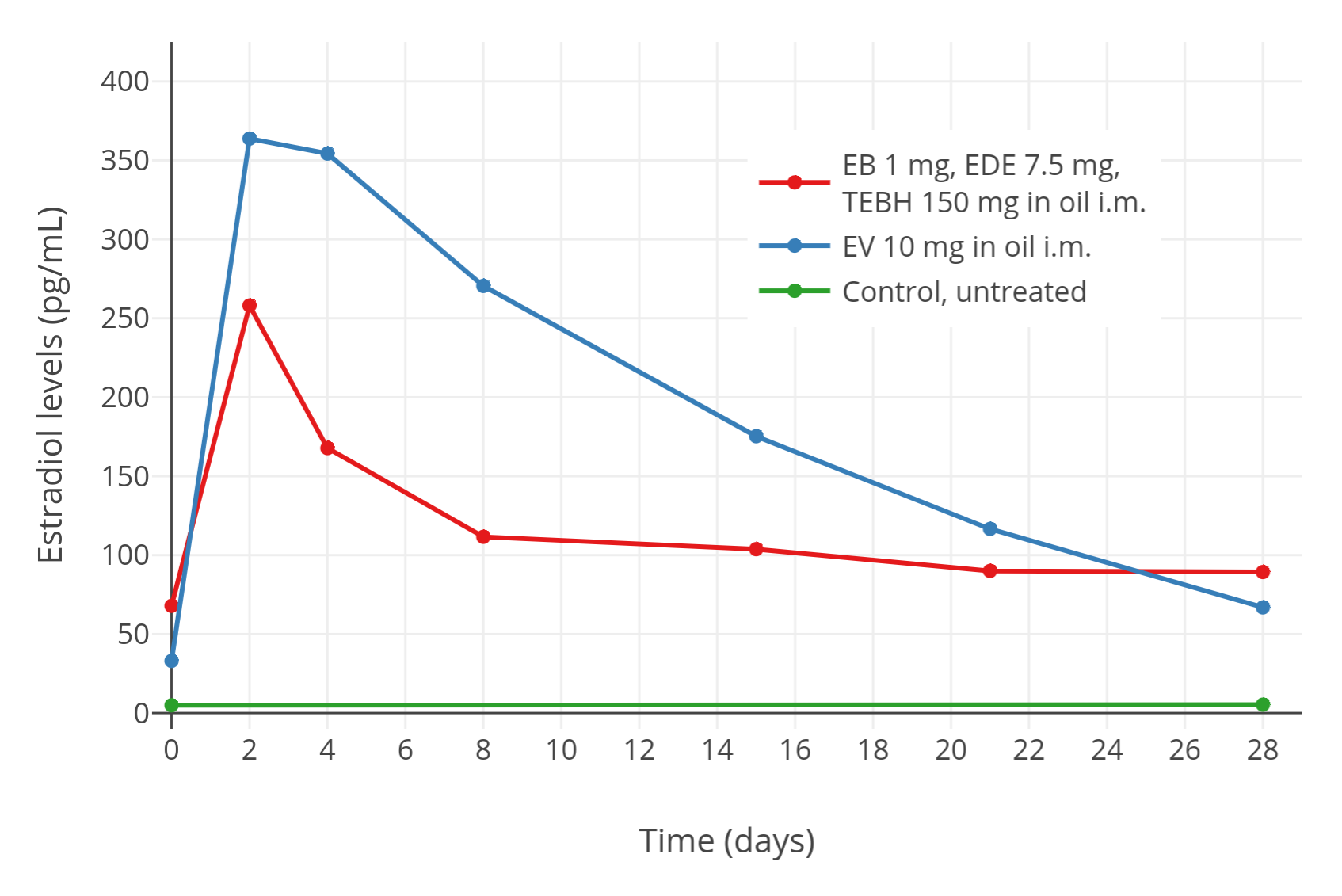
Estradiol levels after an intramuscular injection of 10 mg estradiol valerate in oil or Climacteron (1 mg estradiol benzoate, 7.5 mg estradiol dienanthate in oil) in ovariectomized women. Assays were performed using RIA. Source was Sherwin et al. (1987).

=== Pharmacokinetics ===
Estradiol and testosterone levels following a single intramuscular injection of Climacteron (including 1 mg EB, 7.5 mg EDE, and 150 mg TEBH equivalent to 69 mg free testosterone) versus 10 mg estradiol valerate have been studied over 28 days.

Potencies and durations of natural estrogens by intramuscular injection
Estrogen	Form	Dose (mg)		Duration by dose (mg)
Estrogen	Form	EPD	CICD	Duration by dose (mg)
Estradiol	Aq. soln.	?	–	<1 d
Estradiol	Oil soln.	40–60	–	1–2 ≈ 1–2 d
Estradiol	Aq. susp.	?	3.5	0.5–2 ≈ 2–7 d; 3.5 ≈ >5 d
Estradiol	Microsph.	?	–	1 ≈ 30 d
Estradiol benzoate	Oil soln.	25–35	–	1.66 ≈ 2–3 d; 5 ≈ 3–6 d
Estradiol benzoate	Aq. susp.	20	–	10 ≈ 16–21 d
Estradiol benzoate	Emulsion	?	–	10 ≈ 14–21 d
Estradiol dipropionate	Oil soln.	25–30	–	5 ≈ 5–8 d
Estradiol valerate	Oil soln.	20–30	5	5 ≈ 7–8 d; 10 ≈ 10–14 d; 40 ≈ 14–21 d; 100 ≈ 21–28 d
Estradiol benz. butyrate	Oil soln.	?	10	10 ≈ 21 d
Estradiol cypionate	Oil soln.	20–30	–	5 ≈ 11–14 d
Estradiol cypionate	Aq. susp.	?	5	5 ≈ 14–24 d
Estradiol enanthate	Oil soln.	?	5–10	10 ≈ 20–30 d
Estradiol dienanthate	Oil soln.	?	–	7.5 ≈ >40 d
Estradiol undecylate	Oil soln.	?	–	10–20 ≈ 40–60 d; 25–50 ≈ 60–120 d
Polyestradiol phosphate	Aq. soln.	40–60	–	40 ≈ 30 d; 80 ≈ 60 d; 160 ≈ 120 d
Estrone	Oil soln.	?	–	1–2 ≈ 2–3 d
Estrone	Aq. susp.	?	–	0.1–2 ≈ 2–7 d
Estriol	Oil soln.	?	–	1–2 ≈ 1–4 d
Polyestriol phosphate	Aq. soln.	?	–	50 ≈ 30 d; 80 ≈ 60 d
Notes and sources Notes: All aqueous suspensions are of microcrystalline particle size. Estradiol production during the menstrual cycle is 30–640 µg/d (6.4–8.6 mg total per month or cycle). The vaginal epithelium maturation dosage of estradiol benzoate or estradiol valerate has been reported as 5 to 7 mg/week. An effective ovulation-inhibiting dose of estradiol undecylate is 20–30 mg/month. Sources: See template.

== Chemistry ==
EDE is a synthetic estrane steroid and the C3 and C17β heptanoate (enanthate) diester of estradiol. It is also known as estradiol 3,17β-heptanoate or as estra-1,3,5(10)-triene-3,17β-diol 3,17β-diheptanoate. EDE is structurally related to estradiol enanthate (estradiol 17β-heptanoate), which has a single heptanoate ester rather than two.

Structural properties of selected estradiol esters
Estrogen	Structure	Ester(s)				Relative mol. weight	Relative E2 content^{b}	log P^{c}
Estrogen	Structure	Position(s)	Moiet(ies)	Type	Length^{a}	Relative mol. weight	Relative E2 content^{b}	log P^{c}
Estradiol		–	–	–	–	1.00	1.00	4.0
Estradiol acetate		C3	Ethanoic acid	Straight-chain fatty acid	2	1.15	0.87	4.2
Estradiol benzoate		C3	Benzoic acid	Aromatic fatty acid	– (~4–5)	1.38	0.72	4.7
Estradiol dipropionate		C3, C17β	Propanoic acid (×2)	Straight-chain fatty acid	3 (×2)	1.41	0.71	4.9
Estradiol valerate		C17β	Pentanoic acid	Straight-chain fatty acid	5	1.31	0.76	5.6–6.3
Estradiol benzoate butyrate		C3, C17β	Benzoic acid, butyric acid	Mixed fatty acid	– (~6, 2)	1.64	0.61	6.3
Estradiol cypionate		C17β	Cyclopentylpropanoic acid	Cyclic fatty acid	– (~6)	1.46	0.69	6.9
Estradiol enanthate		C17β	Heptanoic acid	Straight-chain fatty acid	7	1.41	0.71	6.7–7.3
Estradiol dienanthate		C3, C17β	Heptanoic acid (×2)	Straight-chain fatty acid	7 (×2)	1.82	0.55	8.1–10.4
Estradiol undecylate		C17β	Undecanoic acid	Straight-chain fatty acid	11	1.62	0.62	9.2–9.8
Estradiol stearate		C17β	Octadecanoic acid	Straight-chain fatty acid	18	1.98	0.51	12.2–12.4
Estradiol distearate		C3, C17β	Octadecanoic acid (×2)	Straight-chain fatty acid	18 (×2)	2.96	0.34	20.2
Estradiol sulfate		C3	Sulfuric acid	Water-soluble conjugate	–	1.29	0.77	0.3–3.8
Estradiol glucuronide		C17β	Glucuronic acid	Water-soluble conjugate	–	1.65	0.61	2.1–2.7
Estramustine phosphate^{d}		C3, C17β	Normustine, phosphoric acid	Water-soluble conjugate	–	1.91	0.52	2.9–5.0
Polyestradiol phosphate^{e}		C3–C17β	Phosphoric acid	Water-soluble conjugate	–	1.23^{f}	0.81^{f}	2.9^{g}
Footnotes: ^{a} = Length of ester in carbon atoms for straight-chain fatty acids or approximate length of ester in carbon atoms for aromatic or cyclic fatty acids. ^{b} = Relative estradiol content by weight (i.e., relative estrogenic exposure). ^{c} = Experimental or predicted octanol/water partition coefficient (i.e., lipophilicity/hydrophobicity). Retrieved from PubChem, ChemSpider, and DrugBank. ^{d} = Also known as estradiol normustine phosphate. ^{e} = Polymer of estradiol phosphate (~13 repeat units). ^{f} = Relative molecular weight or estradiol content per repeat unit. ^{g} = log P of repeat unit (i.e., estradiol phosphate). Sources: See individual articles.

== History ==
EDE was first described and introduced for medical use by 1959.

== Society and culture ==
=== Brand names ===
EDE was marketed in combination with EB and TEBH under the brand names Climacteron, Amenose, Lactimex, and Lactostat.

=== Availability ===
EDE is no longer available but was previously used in Canada, Germany and other countries.

== See also ==
- Estradiol benzoate/estradiol dienanthate/testosterone enanthate benzilic acid hydrazone
