= Estradiol benzoate butyrate =

Chemical compound

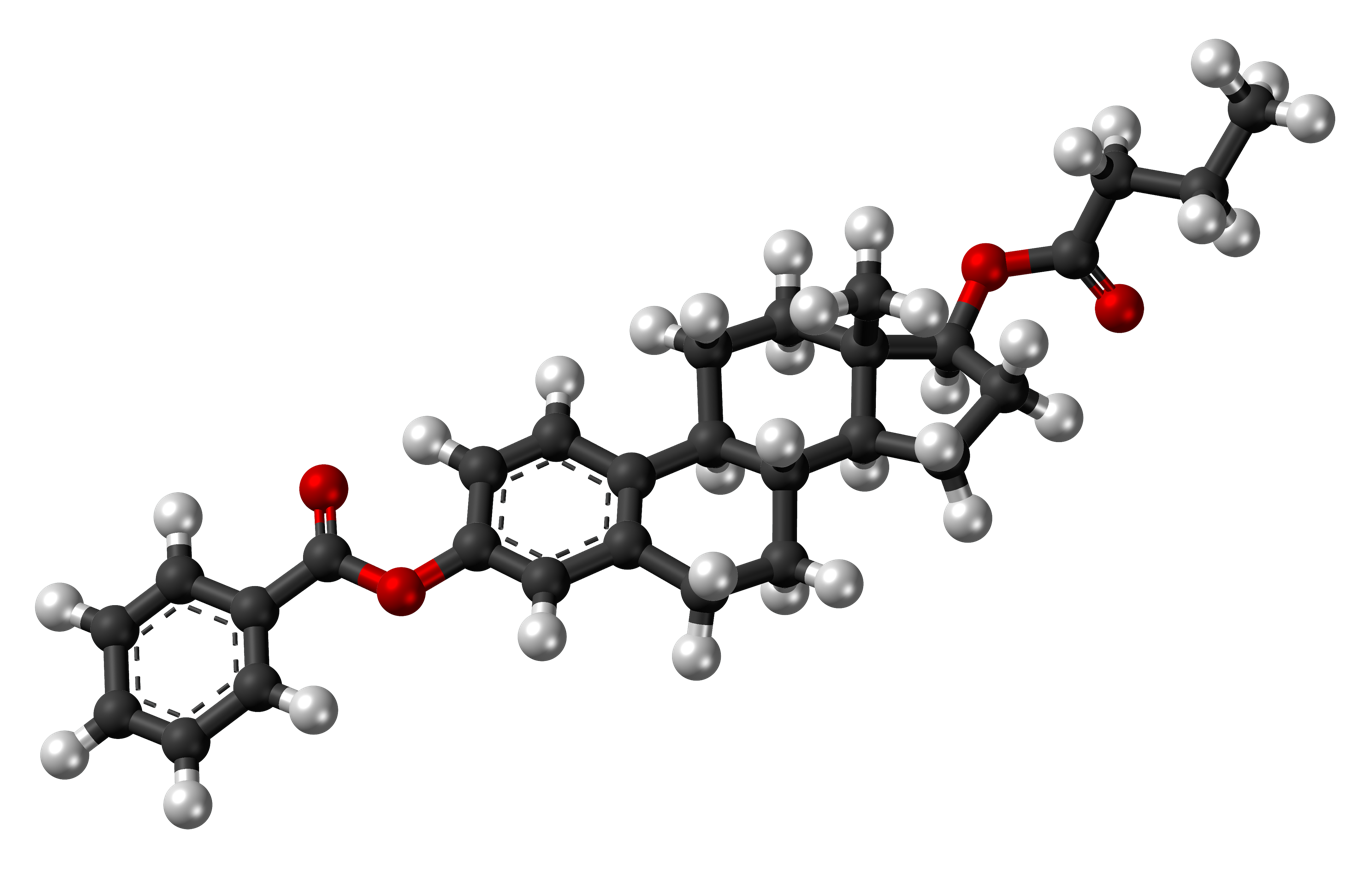

Clinical data
- Trade names: Neolutin N, Redimen, Soluna, Unijab (all combinations)
- Other names: EBB; Estradiol 3-benzoate 17β-n-butyrate; Estra-1,3,5(10)-triene-3,17β-diol 3-benzoate 17β-n-butyrate
- Routes of administration: Intramuscular injection
- Drug class: Estrogen; Estrogen ester

Identifiers
- IUPAC name: [(8R,9S,13S,14S,17S)-17-butanoyloxy-13-methyl-6,7,8,9,11,12,14,15,16,17-decahydrocyclopenta[a]phenanthren-3-yl] benzoate
- CAS Number: 63042-18-2
- PubChem CID: 67081
- ChemSpider: 60431
- UNII: ZE4IGI4UMH
- CompTox Dashboard (EPA): DTXSID20978979
- ECHA InfoCard: 100.057.989

Chemical and physical data
- Formula: C_{29}H_{34}O_{4}
- Molar mass: 446.587 g·mol^{−1}
- 3D model (JSmol): Interactive image
- SMILES: CCCC(=O)O[C@H]1CC[C@@H]2[C@@]1(CC[C@H]3[C@H]2CCC4=C3C=CC(=C4)OC(=O)C5=CC=CC=C5)C
- InChI: InChI=1S/C29H34O4/c1-3-7-27(30)33-26-15-14-25-24-12-10-20-18-21(32-28(31)19-8-5-4-6-9-19)11-13-22(20)23(24)16-17-29(25,26)2/h4-6,8-9,11,13,18,23-26H,3,7,10,12,14-17H2,1-2H3/t23-,24-,25+,26+,29+/m1/s1; Key:MKYFGNOOEKZNPW-ZRJUGLEFSA-N

Estradiol benzoate butyrate (EBB), sold under the brand names Neolutin N, Redimen, Soluna, and Unijab and formerly known under the developmental code name Unimens, is an estrogen medication which is used in hormonal birth control for women. It is formulated in combination with dihydroxyprogesterone acetophenide (DHPA; algestone acetophenide), a progestin, and is used specifically as a combined injectable contraceptive. EBB is not available for medical use alone. The medication, in combination with DHPA, is given by injection into muscle once a month.

Side effects of EBB include breast tenderness, breast enlargement, nausea, headache, and fluid retention. EBB is an estrogen and hence is an agonist of the estrogen receptor, the biological target of estrogens like estradiol. It is an estrogen ester and a prodrug of estradiol in the body. Because of this, it is considered to be a natural and bioidentical form of estrogen.

EBB was first described in 1938. It was developed for use as a form of birth control in the 1970s and was introduced for medical use for this indication by the 1980s. The medication is used in combination with DHPA as a combined injectable contraceptive in Peru and Singapore.

== Medical uses ==
EBB is used in combination with DHPA as a once-a-month combined injectable contraceptive to prevent pregnancy in women.

=== Available forms ===
The combination of EBB and DHPA contains 10 mg estradiol benzoate butyrate (EBB), an estrogen, and 150 mg algestone acetophenide (dihydroxyprogesterone acetophenide; DHPA), a progestin.

== Side effects ==
The combination of EBB and DHPA is said to be associated with poor control of menstrual bleeding when used as a once-a-month combined injectable contraceptive.

== Pharmacology ==
Estradiol, the active form of EBB.

=== Pharmacodynamics ===
EBB is an estradiol ester, or a prodrug of estradiol. As such, it is an estrogen, or an agonist of the estrogen receptors. EBB is of about 64% higher molecular weight than estradiol due to the presence of its C3 benzoate and C17β butyrate esters. Because EBB is a prodrug of estradiol, it is considered to be a natural and bioidentical form of estrogen.

The estrogenic potency of oral ethinylestradiol is approximately 30-fold higher than that of parenteral EBB. In accordance, 50 μg/day oral ethinylestradiol has been reported to be about 3 times stronger in estrogenic effect than once-a-month injections of 10 mg EBB.

Potencies and durations of natural estrogens by intramuscular injection
Estrogen	Form	Dose (mg)		Duration by dose (mg)
Estrogen	Form	EPD	CICD	Duration by dose (mg)
Estradiol	Aq. soln.	?	–	<1 d
Estradiol	Oil soln.	40–60	–	1–2 ≈ 1–2 d
Estradiol	Aq. susp.	?	3.5	0.5–2 ≈ 2–7 d; 3.5 ≈ >5 d
Estradiol	Microsph.	?	–	1 ≈ 30 d
Estradiol benzoate	Oil soln.	25–35	–	1.66 ≈ 2–3 d; 5 ≈ 3–6 d
Estradiol benzoate	Aq. susp.	20	–	10 ≈ 16–21 d
Estradiol benzoate	Emulsion	?	–	10 ≈ 14–21 d
Estradiol dipropionate	Oil soln.	25–30	–	5 ≈ 5–8 d
Estradiol valerate	Oil soln.	20–30	5	5 ≈ 7–8 d; 10 ≈ 10–14 d; 40 ≈ 14–21 d; 100 ≈ 21–28 d
Estradiol benz. butyrate	Oil soln.	?	10	10 ≈ 21 d
Estradiol cypionate	Oil soln.	20–30	–	5 ≈ 11–14 d
Estradiol cypionate	Aq. susp.	?	5	5 ≈ 14–24 d
Estradiol enanthate	Oil soln.	?	5–10	10 ≈ 20–30 d
Estradiol dienanthate	Oil soln.	?	–	7.5 ≈ >40 d
Estradiol undecylate	Oil soln.	?	–	10–20 ≈ 40–60 d; 25–50 ≈ 60–120 d
Polyestradiol phosphate	Aq. soln.	40–60	–	40 ≈ 30 d; 80 ≈ 60 d; 160 ≈ 120 d
Estrone	Oil soln.	?	–	1–2 ≈ 2–3 d
Estrone	Aq. susp.	?	–	0.1–2 ≈ 2–7 d
Estriol	Oil soln.	?	–	1–2 ≈ 1–4 d
Polyestriol phosphate	Aq. soln.	?	–	50 ≈ 30 d; 80 ≈ 60 d
Notes and sources Notes: All aqueous suspensions are of microcrystalline particle size. Estradiol production during the menstrual cycle is 30–640 µg/d (6.4–8.6 mg total per month or cycle). The vaginal epithelium maturation dosage of estradiol benzoate or estradiol valerate has been reported as 5 to 7 mg/week. An effective ovulation-inhibiting dose of estradiol undecylate is 20–30 mg/month. Sources: See template.

=== Pharmacokinetics ===
A single 10 mg intramuscular injection of EBB has a duration of approximately 3 weeks. Its duration is shorter than that of estradiol enantate. A preliminary study of the duration of EBB relative to other estradiol esters was conducted in 1952.

== Chemistry ==
EBB is a synthetic estrane steroid and the C3 benzoate (benzenecarboxylate) and C17β butyrate (butanoate) diester of estradiol. It is also known as estradiol 3-benzoate 17β-n-butyrate or as estra-1,3,5(10)-triene-3,17β-diol 3-benzoate 17β-n-butyrate.

The experimental octanol/water partition coefficient (logP) of EBB is 6.3.

Structural properties of selected estradiol esters
Estrogen	Structure	Ester(s)				Relative mol. weight	Relative E2 content^{b}	log P^{c}
Estrogen	Structure	Position(s)	Moiet(ies)	Type	Length^{a}	Relative mol. weight	Relative E2 content^{b}	log P^{c}
Estradiol		–	–	–	–	1.00	1.00	4.0
Estradiol acetate		C3	Ethanoic acid	Straight-chain fatty acid	2	1.15	0.87	4.2
Estradiol benzoate		C3	Benzoic acid	Aromatic fatty acid	– (~4–5)	1.38	0.72	4.7
Estradiol dipropionate		C3, C17β	Propanoic acid (×2)	Straight-chain fatty acid	3 (×2)	1.41	0.71	4.9
Estradiol valerate		C17β	Pentanoic acid	Straight-chain fatty acid	5	1.31	0.76	5.6–6.3
Estradiol benzoate butyrate		C3, C17β	Benzoic acid, butyric acid	Mixed fatty acid	– (~6, 2)	1.64	0.61	6.3
Estradiol cypionate		C17β	Cyclopentylpropanoic acid	Cyclic fatty acid	– (~6)	1.46	0.69	6.9
Estradiol enanthate		C17β	Heptanoic acid	Straight-chain fatty acid	7	1.41	0.71	6.7–7.3
Estradiol dienanthate		C3, C17β	Heptanoic acid (×2)	Straight-chain fatty acid	7 (×2)	1.82	0.55	8.1–10.4
Estradiol undecylate		C17β	Undecanoic acid	Straight-chain fatty acid	11	1.62	0.62	9.2–9.8
Estradiol stearate		C17β	Octadecanoic acid	Straight-chain fatty acid	18	1.98	0.51	12.2–12.4
Estradiol distearate		C3, C17β	Octadecanoic acid (×2)	Straight-chain fatty acid	18 (×2)	2.96	0.34	20.2
Estradiol sulfate		C3	Sulfuric acid	Water-soluble conjugate	–	1.29	0.77	0.3–3.8
Estradiol glucuronide		C17β	Glucuronic acid	Water-soluble conjugate	–	1.65	0.61	2.1–2.7
Estramustine phosphate^{d}		C3, C17β	Normustine, phosphoric acid	Water-soluble conjugate	–	1.91	0.52	2.9–5.0
Polyestradiol phosphate^{e}		C3–C17β	Phosphoric acid	Water-soluble conjugate	–	1.23^{f}	0.81^{f}	2.9^{g}
Footnotes: ^{a} = Length of ester in carbon atoms for straight-chain fatty acids or approximate length of ester in carbon atoms for aromatic or cyclic fatty acids. ^{b} = Relative estradiol content by weight (i.e., relative estrogenic exposure). ^{c} = Experimental or predicted octanol/water partition coefficient (i.e., lipophilicity/hydrophobicity). Retrieved from PubChem, ChemSpider, and DrugBank. ^{d} = Also known as estradiol normustine phosphate. ^{e} = Polymer of estradiol phosphate (~13 repeat units). ^{f} = Relative molecular weight or estradiol content per repeat unit. ^{g} = log P of repeat unit (i.e., estradiol phosphate). Sources: See individual articles.

== History ==
EBB, along with a variety of other estradiol esters, was first described in 1938 by Karl Miescher and colleagues of Ciba in Basel, Switzerland. It was developed in combination with DHPA as a combined injectable contraceptive in the 1970s. The combination was marketed for use as a combined injectable contraceptive in Peru by 1987.

== Society and culture ==
=== Brand names ===
EBB is marketed in combination with DHPA under the brand names Neolutin N, Redimen, Soluna, and Unijab. It was originally developed under the tentative brand name Unimens, but ultimately was not marketed under this particular brand name.

=== Availability ===
The combination of EBB and DHPA is available only in Peru and Singapore.

== See also ==
- Estradiol benzoate butyrate/dihydroxyprogesterone acetophenide
