= Testosterone enantate benzilic acid hydrazone =

Chemical compound

Clinical data
- Trade names: Climacteron, Lactimex, Lactostat
- Other names: Testosterone enantate benziloylhydrazone; Testosterone 17β-enantate 3-benzilic acid hydrazone; TEBH; TEBAH; TEBaH
- Routes of administration: Intramuscular injection

Identifiers
- IUPAC name: [(3Z,8R,9S,10R,13S,14S)-3-[(2-Hydroxy-2,2-diphenylacetyl)hydrazinylidene]-10,13-dimethyl-1,2,6,7,8,9,11,12,14,15,16,17-dodecahydrocyclopenta[a]phenanthren-17-yl] heptanoate
- CAS Number: 18625-33-7
- PubChem CID: 101982710
- DrugBank: DB13947
- ChemSpider: 21160607
- UNII: X8Z8A2G2Y4

Chemical and physical data
- Formula: C_{40}H_{52}N_{2}O_{4}
- Molar mass: 624.866 g·mol^{−1}
- 3D model (JSmol): Interactive image
- SMILES: CCCCCCC(=O)OC1CC[C@@H]2[C@@]1(CC[C@H]3[C@H]2CCC4=C/C(=N\NC(=O)C(C5=CC=CC=C5)(C6=CC=CC=C6)O)/CC[C@]34C)C
- InChI: InChI=1S/C40H52N2O4/c1-4-5-6-13-18-36(43)46-35-22-21-33-32-20-19-30-27-31(23-25-38(30,2)34(32)24-26-39(33,35)3)41-42-37(44)40(45,28-14-9-7-10-15-28)29-16-11-8-12-17-29/h7-12,14-17,27,32-35,45H,4-6,13,18-26H2,1-3H3,(H,42,44)/b41-31-/t32-,33-,34-,35?,38-,39-/m0/s1; Key:PTVXYACXDYZNID-JKNBFTAXSA-N

Testosterone enantate benzilic acid hydrazone (TEBH), or testosterone 17β-enantate 3-benzilic acid hydrazone, is a synthetic, injected androgen/anabolic steroid and an androgen ester – specifically, the C17β enantate (heptanoate) ester and C3 benzilic acid hydrazone of testosterone. It was previously marketed in combination with estradiol benzoate and estradiol dienantate under the brand names Climacteron, Lactimex, and Lactostat. Clinical studies have assessed this formulation. TEBH was first described in the scientific literature in 1959. It is a very long-lasting prodrug of testosterone when administered in oil via intramuscular injection.

Androgen replacement therapy formulations and dosages used in women
Route	Medication	Major brand names	Form	Dosage
Oral	Testosterone undecanoate	Andriol, Jatenzo	Capsule	40–80 mg 1x/1–2 days
Oral	Methyltestosterone	Metandren, Estratest	Tablet	0.5–10 mg/day
Oral	Fluoxymesterone	Halotestin	Tablet	1–2.5 mg 1x/1–2 days
Oral	Normethandrone^{a}	Ginecoside	Tablet	5 mg/day
Oral	Tibolone	Livial	Tablet	1.25–2.5 mg/day
Oral	Prasterone (DHEA)^{b}	–	Tablet	10–100 mg/day
Sublingual	Methyltestosterone	Metandren	Tablet	0.25 mg/day
Transdermal	Testosterone	Intrinsa	Patch	150–300 μg/day
Transdermal	Testosterone	AndroGel	Gel, cream	1–10 mg/day
Vaginal	Prasterone (DHEA)	Intrarosa	Insert	6.5 mg/day
Injection	Testosterone propionate^{a}	Testoviron	Oil solution	25 mg 1x/1–2 weeks
Injection	Testosterone enanthate	Delatestryl, Primodian Depot	Oil solution	25–100 mg 1x/4–6 weeks
Injection	Testosterone cypionate	Depo-Testosterone, Depo-Testadiol	Oil solution	25–100 mg 1x/4–6 weeks
Injection	Testosterone isobutyrate^{a}	Femandren M, Folivirin	Aqueous suspension	25–50 mg 1x/4–6 weeks
Injection	Mixed testosterone esters	Climacteron^{a}	Oil solution	150 mg 1x/4–8 weeks
Injection	Mixed testosterone esters	Omnadren, Sustanon	Oil solution	50–100 mg 1x/4–6 weeks
Injection	Nandrolone decanoate	Deca-Durabolin	Oil solution	25–50 mg 1x/6–12 weeks
Injection	Prasterone enanthate^{a}	Gynodian Depot	Oil solution	200 mg 1x/4–6 weeks
Implant	Testosterone	Testopel	Pellet	50–100 mg 1x/3–6 months
Notes: Premenopausal women produce about 230 ± 70 μg testosterone per day (6.4 ± 2.0 mg testosterone per 4 weeks), with a range of 130 to 330 μg per day (3.6–9.2 mg per 4 weeks). Footnotes: ^{a} = Mostly discontinued or unavailable. ^{b} = Over-the-counter. Sources: See template.

== Chemistry ==
Chemical synthesis of TEBH has been described.

== See also ==
- List of androgen esters § Testosterone esters
- Hydroxyprogesterone heptanoate benzilic acid hydrazone
