= Hydroxyprogesterone heptanoate benzilic acid hydrazone =

Chemical compound

Clinical data
- Other names: Hydroxyprogesterone heptanoate benziloylhydrazone; OHPHBH; Hydroxyprogesterone enanthate benzilic acid hydrazone; 17α-Hydroxyprogesterone 17α-heptanoate 3-benzilic acid hydrazone
- Routes of administration: Intramuscular injection
- Drug class: Progestin; Progestogen; Progestogen ester

Identifiers
- CAS Number: 120023-34-9
- ChemSpider: 129864934

Chemical and physical data
- Formula: C_{42}H_{54}N_{2}O_{5}
- Molar mass: 666.903 g·mol^{−1}
- 3D model (JSmol): Interactive image
- SMILES: O(C(CCCCCC)=O)[C@@](C(C)=O)1CC[C@]([H])2[C@@]([H])3CCC4=C/C(/CC[C@]4(C)[C@@]3([H])CC[C@@]21C)=N/N([H])C(C(O[H])(C1=CC=CC=C1)C1=CC=CC=C1)=O
- InChI: InChI=KECPQDDETDYRFU-HXKOVYISSA-N; Key:1S/C42H54N2O5/c1-5-6-7-14-19-37(46)49-41(29(2)45)27-24-36-34-21-20-32-28-33(22-25-39(32,3)35(34)23-26-40(36,41)4)43-44-38(47)42(48,30-15-10-8-11-16-30)31-17-12-9-13-18-31/h8-13,15-18,28,34-36,48H,5-7,14,19-27H2,1-4H3,(H,44,47)/b43-33+/t34-,35+,36+,39+,40+,41+/m1/s1

Hydroxyprogesterone heptanoate benzilic acid hydrazone (OHPHBH), also known as 17α-hydroxyprogesterone 17α-heptanoate 3-benzilic acid hydrazone, is a progestin medication which was never marketed. It is the C3 benzilic acid hydrazone of hydroxyprogesterone heptanoate (OHPH). The medication has a longer duration of action than OHPH when administered by subcutaneous injection in animals.

== See also ==
- Testosterone enantate benzilic acid hydrazone
- List of progestogen esters § Esters of 17α-hydroxyprogesterone derivatives
