= Structural unit =

Building block of a polymer chain

In polymer chemistry, a structural unit is a building block of a polymer chain. It is the result of a monomer which has been polymerized into a long chain.

There may be more than one structural unit in the repeat unit. When different monomers are polymerized, a copolymer is formed. It is a routine way of developing new properties for new materials.

== Example ==
Consider the example of polyethylene terephthalate (PET or "polyester"). The monomers which could be used to create this polymer are ethylene glycol and terephthalic acid:

HO-CH_{2}-CH_{2}-OH and HOOC-C_{6}H_{4}-COOH

In the polymer, there are two structural units, which are -O-CH_{2}-CH_{2}-O- and -CO-C_{6}H_{4}-CO-

The repeat unit is

-CH_{2}-CH_{2}-O-CO-C_{6}H_{4}-CO-O-

== Functionality of structural units ==
The functionality of a monomeric structural unit is defined as the number of covalent bonds which it forms with other reactants. A structural unit in a linear polymer chain segment forms two bonds and is therefore bifunctional, as for the PET structural units above.

Other values of functionality exist. Unless the macromolecule is cyclic, it will have monovalent structural units at each end of the polymer chain. In branched polymers, there are trifunctional units at each branch point. For example, in the synthesis of PET, a small fraction of the ethylene glycol can be replaced by glycerol which has three alcohol groups. This trifunctional molecule inserts itself in the polymeric chain and bonds to three carboxylic acid groups forming a branch point.

Finally, the formation of cross-linked polymers involves tetrafunctional structural units. For example, in the synthesis of cross-linked polystyrene, a small fraction of monomeric styrene (or vinylbenzene) is replaced by 1,4-divinylbenzene (or para-divinylbenzene). Each of the two vinyl groups is inserted into a polymeric chain, so that the tetravalent unit is inserted into both chains, linking them together.

== See also ==
- Repeat unit
