= Oenanthe =

Oenanthe can refer to:

== Taxonomy ==
- Oenanthe (bird), a genus of birds in the family Muscicapidae
- Oenanthe (plant), a genus of plants in the family Apiaceae

== Persons ==
- Oenanthe of Egypt (flourished 3rd century BC), Egyptian Greek noblewoman and the wife of Agathocles
