= Heavy legs =

Feeling of pain and heaviness in the lower limbs

Heavy legs is a condition described as an unpleasant sensation of pain and heaviness in the lower limbs. Symptoms include legs feeling weighted, stiff, and tired.

Heavy legs can be caused by a wide-ranging collection of disorders including but not restricted to varicose veins, peripheral artery disease, restless legs syndrome, multiple sclerosis, venous insufficiency.
