= Repeat unit =

Section of a polymer whose repetition would reproduce the polymer chain

A repeat unit or repeating unit, or mer, is a part of a polymer whose repetition would produce the complete polymer chain (except for the end groups) by linking the repeat units together successively along the chain, like the beads of a necklace.

IUPAC definitions

constitutional unit: An atom or group of atoms (with pendant atoms or groups, if any) comprising a part of the essential structure of a macromolecule, an oligomer molecule, a block or a chain.
constitutional repeating unit: The smallest constitutional unit the repetition of which constitutes a regular macromolecule, a regular oligomer molecule, a regular block or a regular chain.

A repeat unit is sometimes called a mer (or mer unit) in polymer chemistry. "Mer" originates from the Greek word meros, which means "a part". The word polymer derives its meaning from this, which means "many mers". The mer is not the same thing as a monomer—a mer is a repeating unit within a larger molecule, whereas a monomer is an actual molecule that exists independently, either prior to polymerization or after decomposition.

== Overview ==
One of the simplest repeat units is that of the addition polymer polyvinyl chloride, -[CH_{2}-CHCl]_{n}-, whose repeat unit is -[CH_{2}-CHCl]-. In this case the repeat unit has the same atoms as the monomer vinyl chloride CH_{2}=CHCl. When the polymer is formed, the C=C double bond in the monomer is replaced by a C-C single bond in the polymer repeat unit, which links by two new bonds to adjoining repeat units.

In condensation polymers (see examples below), the repeat unit contains fewer atoms than the monomer or monomers from which it is formed.

The subscript "n" denotes the degree of polymerisation, that is, the number of units linked together. The molecular mass of the repeat unit, M_{R}, is simply the sum of the atomic masses of the atoms within the repeat unit. The molecular mass of the chain is just the product nM_{R}. Other than monodisperse polymers, there is normally a molar mass distribution caused by chains of different length.

In copolymers there are two or more types of repeat unit, which may be arranged in alternation, or at random, or in other more complex patterns.

== Other vinyl polymers ==
Polyethylene may be considered either as -[CH_{2}-CH_{2}-]_{n}- with a repeat unit of -[CH_{2}-CH_{2}]-, or as [-CH_{2}-]_{n}-, with a repeat unit of -[CH_{2}]-. Chemists tend to consider the repeat unit as -[CH_{2}-CH_{2}]- since this polymer is made from the monomer ethylene (CH_{2}=CH_{2}).

More complex repeat units can occur in vinyl polymers -[CH_{2}-CHR]_{n}-, if one hydrogen in the ethylene repeat unit is substituted by a larger fragment R. Polypropylene -[CH_{2}-CH(CH_{3})]_{n}- has the repeat unit -[CH_{2}-CH(CH_{3})]. Polystyrene has a chain where the substituent R is a phenyl group (C_{6}H_{5}), corresponding to a benzene ring minus one hydrogen: -[CH_{2}-CH(C_{6}H_{5})]_{n}-, so the repeat unit is -[CH_{2}-CH(C_{6}H_{5})]-.

== Condensation polymers: repeat unit and structural units ==

In many condensation polymers, the repeat unit contains two structural units related to the comonomers which have been polymerized. For example, in polyethylene terephthalate (PET or "polyester"), the repeat unit is -CO-C_{6}H_{4}-CO-O-CH_{2}-CH_{2}-O-. The polymer is formed by the condensation reaction of the two monomers terephthalic acid (HOOC-C_{6}H_{4}-COOH) and ethylene glycol (HO-CH_{2}-CH_{2}-OH), or their chemical derivatives. The condensation involves loss of water, as an H is lost from each HO- group in the glycol, and an OH from each HOOC- group in the acid. The two structural units in the polymer are then considered to be -CO-C_{6}H_{4}-CO- and -O-CH_{2}-CH_{2}-O-.
