= Enanthic acid =

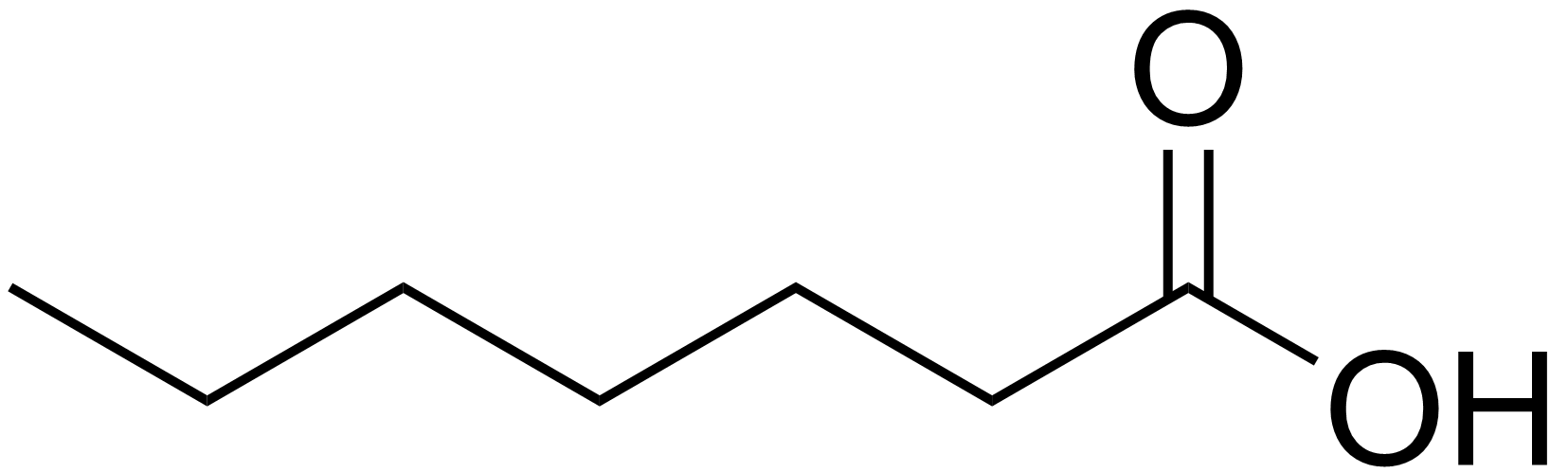
- Heptanoic acid

Names
- Preferred IUPAC name Heptanoic acid
- Other names: Enthanoic acid; Enthanylic acid; Heptoic acid; Heptylic acid; Oenanthic acid; Oenanthylic acid; 1-Hexanecarboxylic acid; C7:0 (lipid numbers)

Identifiers
CAS Number	111-14-8
3D model (JSmol)	Interactive image
ChEBI	CHEBI:45571
ChEMBL	ChEMBL320358
ChemSpider	7803
DrugBank	DB02938
ECHA InfoCard	100.003.490
KEGG	C17714
PubChem CID	8094
UNII	THE3YNP39D
CompTox Dashboard (EPA)	DTXSID2021600
- InChI: InChI=1S/C7H14O2/c1-2-3-4-5-6-7(8)9/h2-6H2,1H3,(H,8,9) Key: MNWFXJYAOYHMED-UHFFFAOYSA-N; InChI=1/C7H14O2/c1-2-3-4-5-6-7(8)9/h2-6H2,1H3,(H,8,9) Key: MNWFXJYAOYHMED-UHFFFAOYAP
- SMILES: O=C(O)CCCCCC

Properties
Chemical formula	C_{7}H_{14}O_{2}
Molar mass	130.187 g·mol^{−1}
Appearance	colorless oily liquid
Density	0.9181 g/cm^{3} (20 °C)
Melting point	−7.5 °C (18.5 °F; 265.6 K)
Boiling point	223 °C (433 °F; 496 K)
Solubility in water	0.2419 g/100 mL (15 °C)
Magnetic susceptibility (χ)	−88.60·10^{−6} cm^{3}/mol

Hazards
- GHS labelling
Pictograms	(GHS05: Corrosive)
Signal word	Danger
Hazard statements	H314
Precautionary statements	P261, P271, P280, P303+P361+P353, P304+P340+P310, P305+P351+P338
NFPA 704 (fire diamond)	3 2 0
- Lethal dose or concentration (LD, LC)
LD_{50} (median dose)	6400 mg/kg (oral, rat)

Related compounds
Related compounds	Hexanoic acid, Octanoic acid
- Except where otherwise noted, data are given for materials in their standard state (at 25 °C [77 °F], 100 kPa). verify (what is ?) Infobox references

Enanthic acid, also called heptanoic acid, is an organic compound composed of a seven-carbon chain terminating in a carboxylic acid functional group. It is a colorless oily liquid with an unpleasant, rancid odor. It contributes to the odor of some rancid oils. It is slightly soluble in water, but very soluble in ethanol and ether. Salts and esters of enanthic acid are called enanthates or heptanoates.

Its name derives from the Latin oenanthe which is in turn derived from the Ancient Greek oinos "wine" and anthos "blossom."

== Production ==
Ricinoleic acid, a fatty acid obtained from castor bean oil, also occurs as its methyl ester, methyl ricinoleate, which is the main precursor to enanthic acid.

The methyl ester of ricinoleic acid, obtained from castor bean oil, is the main commercial precursor to enanthic acid. It is pyrolyzed to the methyl ester of 10-undecenoic acid and heptanal, which is then air-oxidized to the carboxylic acid. Approximately 20,000 tons were consumed in Europe and US in 1980.

Laboratory preparations of enanthic acid include permanganate oxidation of heptanal and 1-octene.

== Uses ==
Enanthic acid is used in the preparation of esters, such as ethyl enanthate, which are used as artificial flavors. Enanthic acid is used to esterify anabolic steroids in the preparation of drugs such as testosterone enanthate, trenbolone enanthate, drostanolone enanthate, and methenolone enanthate.

The triglyceride of enanthic acid is known as triheptanoin, which is a medical food.

== Safety ==
Enanthic acid is corrosive.

== See also ==
- List of saturated fatty acids
- List of carboxylic acids
