= Estradiol undecylate =

Chemical compound

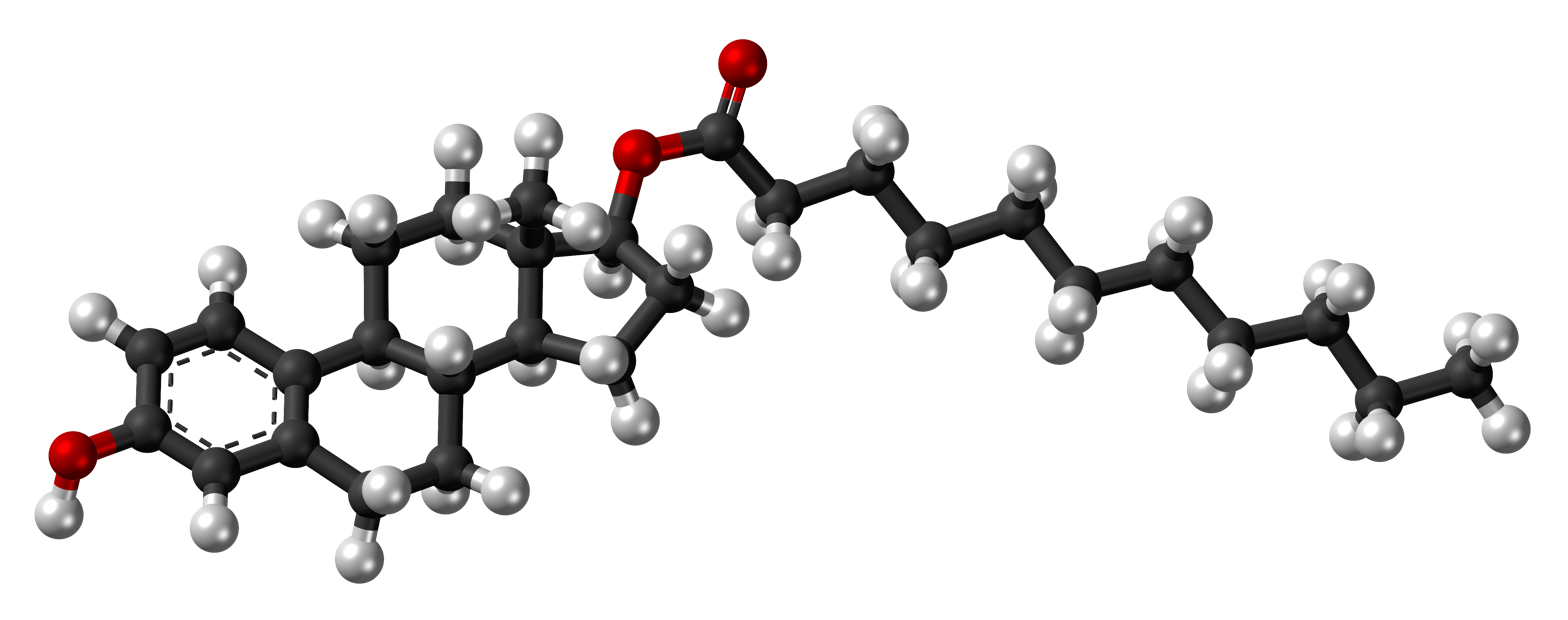

Clinical data
- Pronunciation: /ˌɛstrəˈdaɪɒl ənˈdɛsɪleɪt/ ES-trə-DY-ol un-DESS-il-ayt
- Trade names: Delestrec, Progynon Depot 100, others
- Other names: EU; E2U; Estradiol undecanoate; Estradiol unducelate; RS-1047; SQ-9993
- Routes of administration: Intramuscular injection
- Drug class: Estrogen; Estrogen ester
- ATC code: G03CA03 (WHO)

Legal status
- Legal status: In general: ℞ (Prescription only)

Pharmacokinetic data
- Bioavailability: IM injection: High
- Protein binding: Estradiol: ~98% (to albumin and SHBG)
- Metabolism: Cleavage via esterases in the liver, blood, and tissues
- Metabolites: Estradiol, undecanoic acid, estradiol metabolites
- Elimination half-life: Unknown
- Duration of action: IM injection: • 10–12.5 mg: 1–2 months • 25–50 mg: 2–4 months
- Excretion: Urine

Identifiers
- IUPAC name: [(8R,9S,13S,14S,17S)-3-hydroxy-13-methyl-6,7,8,9,11,12,14,15,16,17-decahydrocyclopenta[a]phenanthren-17-yl] undecanoate
- CAS Number: 3571-53-7
- PubChem CID: 19135
- ChemSpider: 18055
- UNII: H3N3A8MFJC
- KEGG: D04065
- ChEMBL: ChEMBL1697794
- CompTox Dashboard (EPA): DTXSID3023003
- ECHA InfoCard: 100.020.616

Chemical and physical data
- Formula: C_{29}H_{44}O_{3}
- Molar mass: 440.668 g·mol^{−1}
- 3D model (JSmol): Interactive image
- SMILES: CCCCCCCCCCC(=O)O[C@H]1CC[C@@H]2[C@@]1(CC[C@H]3[C@H]2CCC4=C3C=CC(=C4)O)C
- InChI: InChI=1S/C29H44O3/c1-3-4-5-6-7-8-9-10-11-28(31)32-27-17-16-26-25-14-12-21-20-22(30)13-15-23(21)24(25)18-19-29(26,27)2/h13,15,20,24-27,30H,3-12,14,16-19H2,1-2H3/t24-,25-,26+,27+,29+/m1/s1; Key:TXHUMRBWIWWBGW-GVGNIZHQSA-N

Estradiol undecylate (EU, EUn, E2U), also known as estradiol undecanoate and formerly sold under the brand names Delestrec and Progynon Depot 100 among others, is an estrogen medication which has been used in the treatment of prostate cancer in men. It has also been used as a part of hormone therapy for transgender women. Although estradiol undecylate has been used in the past, it was discontinued. The medication has been given by injection into muscle usually once a month.

Side effects of estradiol undecylate in men may include breast tenderness, breast development, feminization, sexual dysfunction, infertility, fluid retention, and cardiovascular issues. Estradiol undecylate is an estrogen and hence is an agonist of the estrogen receptor, the biological target of estrogens like estradiol. It is an estrogen ester and a very long-lasting prodrug of estradiol in the body. Because of this, it is considered to be a natural and bioidentical form of estrogen. An injection of estradiol undecylate has a duration of about 1 to 4 months.

Estradiol undecylate was first described in 1953 and was introduced for medical use by 1956. It remained in use as late as the 2000s before being discontinued. Estradiol undecylate was marketed in Europe, but does not seem to have ever been available in the United States. It was used for many years as a parenteral estrogen to treat prostate cancer in men, although it was not employed as often as polyestradiol phosphate.

== Medical uses ==
Estradiol undecylate has been used as a form of high-dose estrogen therapy to treat prostate cancer, but has since largely been superseded for this indication by newer agents with fewer adverse effects (e.g., gynecomastia and cardiovascular complications) like GnRH analogues and nonsteroidal antiandrogens. It has been assessed for this purpose in a number of clinical studies. It has been used at a dosage of 100 mg every 3 to 4 weeks (or once a month) by intramuscular injection for this indication.

Estradiol undecylate has been used to suppress sex drive in sex offenders. It has been used for this indication at a dosage of 50 to 100 mg by intramuscular injection once every 3 to 4 weeks.

Estradiol undecylate has also been used to treat breast cancer in women. It has been used in menopausal hormone therapy as well, for instance in the treatment of hot flashes and other menopausal symptoms. Along with estradiol valerate, estradiol cypionate, and estradiol benzoate, estradiol undecylate has been used as an intramuscular estrogen in feminizing hormone therapy for transgender women. It has been used at doses of 100 to as much as 800 mg per month by intramuscular injection for this purpose.

Estrogen dosages for prostate cancer
Route/form	Estrogen	Dosage
Oral	Estradiol	1–2 mg 3x/day
Oral	Conjugated estrogens	1.25–2.5 mg 3x/day
Oral	Ethinylestradiol	0.15–3 mg/day
Oral	Ethinylestradiol sulfonate	1–2 mg 1x/week
Oral	Diethylstilbestrol	1–3 mg/day
Oral	Dienestrol	5 mg/day
Oral	Hexestrol	5 mg/day
Oral	Fosfestrol	100–480 mg 1–3x/day
Oral	Chlorotrianisene	12–48 mg/day
Oral	Quadrosilan	900 mg/day
Oral	Estramustine phosphate	140–1400 mg/day
Transdermal patch	Estradiol	2–6x 100 μg/day Scrotal: 1x 100 μg/day
IM or SC injection	Estradiol benzoate	1.66 mg 3x/week
IM or SC injection	Estradiol dipropionate	5 mg 1x/week
IM or SC injection	Estradiol valerate	10–40 mg 1x/1–2 weeks
IM or SC injection	Estradiol undecylate	100 mg 1x/4 weeks
IM or SC injection	Polyestradiol phosphate	Alone: 160–320 mg 1x/4 weeks With oral EE: 40–80 mg 1x/4 weeks
IM or SC injection	Estrone	2–4 mg 2–3x/week
IV injection	Fosfestrol	300–1200 mg 1–7x/week
IV injection	Estramustine phosphate	240–450 mg/day
Note: Dosages are not necessarily equivalent. Sources: See template.

=== Available forms ===
Estradiol undecylate was available as an oil solution for intramuscular injection provided in ampoules at a concentration of 100 mg/mL.

== Contraindications ==
Contraindications of estrogens include coagulation problems, cardiovascular diseases, liver disease, and certain hormone-sensitive cancers such as breast cancer and endometrial cancer, among others.

== Side effects ==
Estradiol undecylate and its side effects have been evaluated for the treatment of advanced prostate cancer in a phase III international multicenter randomized controlled trial headed by Jacobi and colleagues of the Department of Urology, University of Mainz. The study consisted of 191 patients from 12 treatment centers, who were treated for 6 months with intramuscular injections of either 100 mg/month estradiol undecylate (96 men) or 300 mg/week cyproterone acetate (95 men). Findings for a subgroup of 42 men at the University of Mainz center were initially reported in 1978 and 1980. These men were age 51 to 84 years (mean 68 years), and men with pre-existing cardiovascular disease were excluded. A considerable incidence of cardiovascular complications was reported for the estradiol undecylate group (76%; 16/21 incidence total); there was a 67% (14/21) incidence of cardiovascular morbidity and a 9.5% (2/21) incidence of cardiovascular mortality. The cardiovascular morbidity in this group included peripheral edema and superficial thrombophlebitis (38%; 8/21), coronary heart disease (24%; 5/21), and a deep vein thrombosis (4.8%; 1/21), while the cardiovascular mortality included a myocardial infarction (4.8%; 1/21) and a pulmonary embolism (4.8%; 1/21). Eight of the cases of cardiovascular complications in the estradiol undecylate group, including the two deaths, were regarded as "severe". Conversely, no incidence of cardiovascular toxicity occurred in the cyproterone acetate comparison group (0%; 0/21). Other side effects of estradiol undecylate included gynecomastia (100%; 21/21) and erectile dysfunction (90%; 19/21). The cardiovascular complications with estradiol undecylate in this relatively small study are in contrast to large and high-quality clinical studies of high-dose polyestradiol phosphate and transdermal estradiol for prostate cancer, in which minimal to no cardiovascular toxicity has been observed.

An expanded report of 191 patients, which included the 42 patients from the University of Mainz center plus an additional 149 patients from 11 other centers, was published in 1982. The antitumor effectiveness of estradiol undecylate and cyproterone acetate in this study was equivalent. The rates of improvement, no response, and deterioration were 52%, 41%, and 7% in the estradiol undecylate group and 48%, 44%, and 8% in the cyproterone acetate group, respectively. However, the incidence of a selection of specific side effects, including gynecomastia, breast tenderness, and edema, was significantly lower in the cyproterone acetate group than in the estradiol undecylate group (37% vs. 94%, respectively). Gynecomastia specifically occurred in 13% (12/96) of the patients in the cyproterone acetate group and 77% (73/95) of the patients in the estradiol undecylate group. Erectile dysfunction occurred in "essentially all" patients in both groups. Leg edema occurred in 18% (17/95) of the estradiol undecylate group and 4.2% (4/96) of the cyproterone acetate group, while the incidences of superficial thrombophlebitis and coronary heart disease both were not described. The incidence of thrombosis was 4.2% (4/95) in the estradiol undecylate group and 5.3% (5/96) in the cyproterone acetate group. There were five deaths in total, three in the estradiol undecylate group and two in the cyproterone acetate group. Two of the deaths in each of the treatment groups were due to cardiovascular events, while the remaining death in the estradiol undecylate group was due to unknown causes. The similar rate of cardiovascular complications besides edema between estradiol undecylate and cyproterone acetate that was observed is in contrast to the initial 42-patient report and to findings with other estrogens, such as diethylstilbestrol and estramustine phosphate, which have been shown to possess significantly higher cardiovascular toxicity than cyproterone acetate. On the basis of the expanded study, the researchers concluded that cyproterone acetate was an "acceptable alternative" to estrogen therapy with estradiol undecylate, but with a "considerably more favorable" side-effect profile.

After the completion of the initial expanded study, a 5-year extension trial primarily of the Ruhr University Bochum center subgroup, led by Tunn and colleagues, was conducted. In this study, the cyproterone acetate group was changed from intramuscular injections to 100 mg/day oral cyproterone acetate. Of the 39 patients in the study, the global 5-year survival rate was not significantly different between the estradiol undecylate and cyproterone acetate groups (24% and 26%, respectively). In patients without metastases, the 5-year survival rate was 51% in the cyproterone acetate group relative to 43% in the estradiol undecylate group, although the difference was not statistically significant. In terms of non-prostate cancer deaths, there were 5 in the CPA group and 6 in the EU group. The incidence of cardiovascular-related mortality was 3 deaths in the CPA group and 3 deaths in the EU group.

Side effects of estradiol undecylate versus cyproterone acetate in men
Side effect	Estradiol undecylate 100 mg/month i.m. (n = 96)		Cyproterone acetate 100 mg/day oral (n = 95)	
Side effect	n	%	n	%
Gynecomastia*	74	77.1%	12	12.6%
Breast tenderness*	84	87.5%	6	6.3%
Sexual impotence	"Occurred in essentially all patients of both groups"			
Leg edema*	17	17.7%	4	4.2%
Thrombosis	4	4.2%	5	5.3%
Cardiovascular mortality	2	2.1%	2	2.1%
Other mortality	1^{a}	1.0%	0	0%
Notes: For 6 months in 191 men age 51 to 88 years with prostate cancer. Footnotes: * = Differences in incidences between groups were statistically significant. ^{a} = Due to unknown causes. Sources: See template.

The side effects of estradiol undecylate have also been studied and reported beyond the preceding clinical trial programme and for other patient populations, for instance women. Side effects during therapy with massive doses of estradiol undecylate (200 mg three times per week, or 600 mg per week and around 2,400 mg per month total) in postmenopausal women with advanced breast cancer have included appetite loss, nausea, vomiting, vaginal bleeding, vaginal discharge, nipple pigmentation, breast pain, rash, urinary incontinence, edema, drowsiness, hypercalcemia, and local injection-site reactions. Like with other estrogens, treatment with estradiol undecylate has been found to produce testicular abnormalities and disturbances of spermatogenesis in men. In transgender women, estradiol undecylate by intramuscular injection at extremely high doses (200–800 mg/month) was associated with greater incidence of hyperprolactinemia (high prolactin levels) than ethinylestradiol orally at a dose of 100 μg/day (or about 3 mg/month total) (rates of 40% and 16% for prolactin levels greater than 1,000 mU/L, respectively). Switching from estradiol undecylate to ethinylestradiol resulted in a decrease in prolactin levels in many individuals. The preceding dosage of estradiol undecylate corresponds to much greater estrogenic exposure than the dosage of ethinylestradiol. Cyproterone acetate was also used in combination with estrogen in the study.

== Overdose ==
Estradiol undecylate has been used clinically at massive doses of as much as 800 to 2,400 mg per month by intramuscular injection, given in divided doses of 100 to 200 mg per injection two to three times per week. For purposes of comparison, a single 100 mg intramuscular injection of estradiol undecylate has been reported to produce estradiol levels of about 500 pg/mL. Symptoms of estrogen overdosage may include nausea, vomiting, bloating, increased weight, water retention, breast tenderness, vaginal discharge, heavy legs, and leg cramps. These side effects can be diminished by reducing the estrogen dosage.

== Interactions ==
Inhibitors and inducers of cytochrome P450 may influence the metabolism of estradiol and by extension circulating estradiol levels.

== Pharmacology ==
Estradiol, the active form of estradiol undecylate.

=== Pharmacodynamics ===
Esters of estradiol like estradiol undecylate are readily hydrolyzed prodrugs of estradiol, but have an extended duration when administered in oil via intramuscular injection due to a depot effect afforded by their fatty acid ester moiety. As prodrugs of estradiol, estradiol undecylate and other estradiol esters are estrogens. Estradiol undecylate is of about 62% higher molecular weight than estradiol due to the presence of its C17β undecylate ester. Because estradiol undecylate is a prodrug of estradiol, it is considered to be a natural and bioidentical form of estrogen.

The effects of estradiol undecylate on cortisol, dehydroepiandrosterone sulfate, testosterone, prolactin, and sex hormone-binding globulin levels as well as on the hypothalamic–pituitary–adrenal axis have been studied in men with prostate cancer and compared with those of high-dose cyproterone acetate therapy. The effects of estradiol undecylate on serum lipids and ceruloplasmin levels have been studied as well. Additionally, the influence of estradiol undecylate on SHBG levels and free testosterone fraction in women has been described.

Potencies and durations of natural estrogens by intramuscular injection
Estrogen	Form	Dose (mg)		Duration by dose (mg)
Estrogen	Form	EPD	CICD	Duration by dose (mg)
Estradiol	Aq. soln.	?	–	<1 d
Estradiol	Oil soln.	40–60	–	1–2 ≈ 1–2 d
Estradiol	Aq. susp.	?	3.5	0.5–2 ≈ 2–7 d; 3.5 ≈ >5 d
Estradiol	Microsph.	?	–	1 ≈ 30 d
Estradiol benzoate	Oil soln.	25–35	–	1.66 ≈ 2–3 d; 5 ≈ 3–6 d
Estradiol benzoate	Aq. susp.	20	–	10 ≈ 16–21 d
Estradiol benzoate	Emulsion	?	–	10 ≈ 14–21 d
Estradiol dipropionate	Oil soln.	25–30	–	5 ≈ 5–8 d
Estradiol valerate	Oil soln.	20–30	5	5 ≈ 7–8 d; 10 ≈ 10–14 d; 40 ≈ 14–21 d; 100 ≈ 21–28 d
Estradiol benz. butyrate	Oil soln.	?	10	10 ≈ 21 d
Estradiol cypionate	Oil soln.	20–30	–	5 ≈ 11–14 d
Estradiol cypionate	Aq. susp.	?	5	5 ≈ 14–24 d
Estradiol enanthate	Oil soln.	?	5–10	10 ≈ 20–30 d
Estradiol dienanthate	Oil soln.	?	–	7.5 ≈ >40 d
Estradiol undecylate	Oil soln.	?	–	10–20 ≈ 40–60 d; 25–50 ≈ 60–120 d
Polyestradiol phosphate	Aq. soln.	40–60	–	40 ≈ 30 d; 80 ≈ 60 d; 160 ≈ 120 d
Estrone	Oil soln.	?	–	1–2 ≈ 2–3 d
Estrone	Aq. susp.	?	–	0.1–2 ≈ 2–7 d
Estriol	Oil soln.	?	–	1–2 ≈ 1–4 d
Polyestriol phosphate	Aq. soln.	?	–	50 ≈ 30 d; 80 ≈ 60 d
Notes and sources Notes: All aqueous suspensions are of microcrystalline particle size. Estradiol production during the menstrual cycle is 30–640 µg/d (6.4–8.6 mg total per month or cycle). The vaginal epithelium maturation dosage of estradiol benzoate or estradiol valerate has been reported as 5 to 7 mg/week. An effective ovulation-inhibiting dose of estradiol undecylate is 20–30 mg/month. Sources: See template.

==== Antigonadotropic activity ====
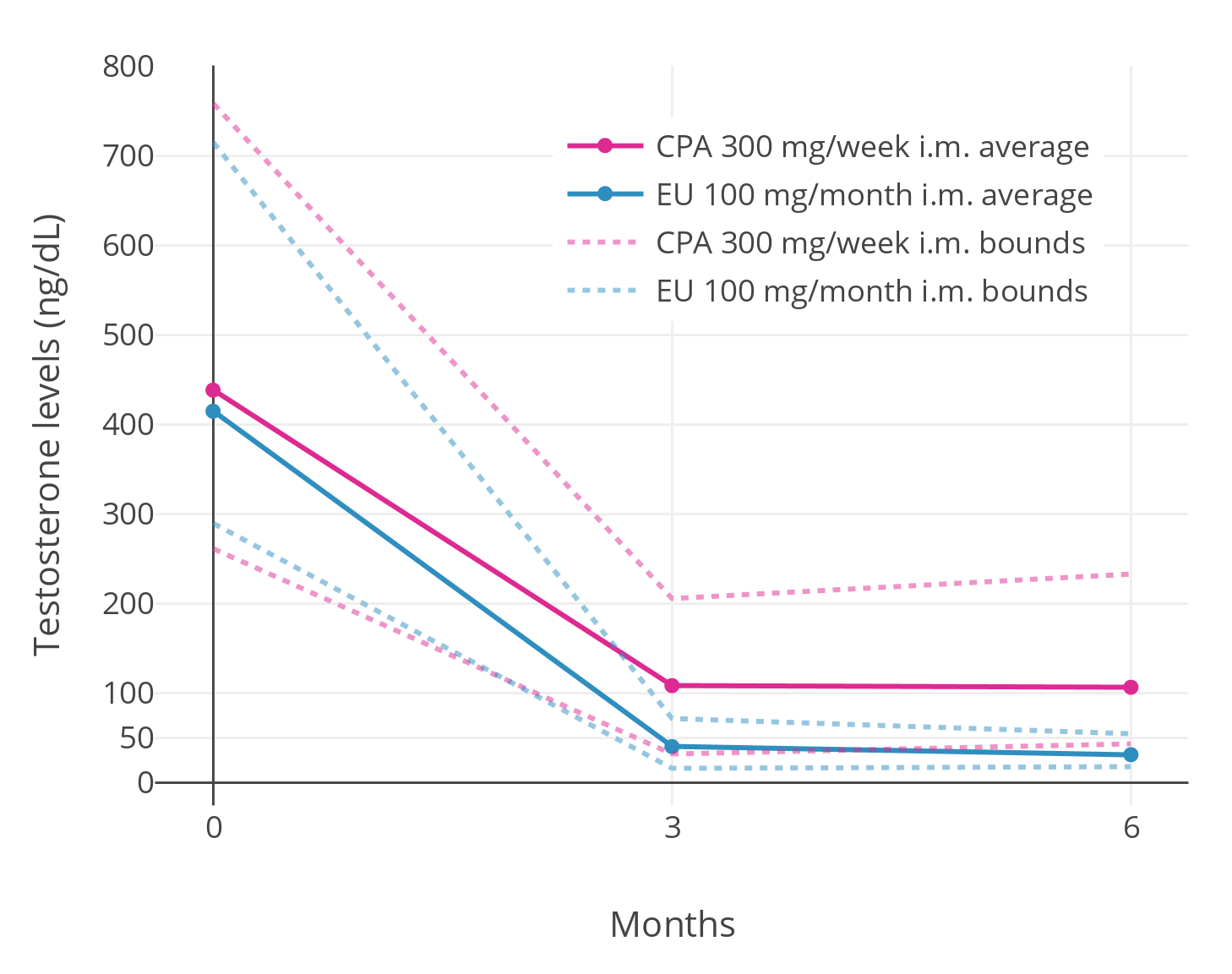
Testosterone levels with 300 mg/week cyproterone acetate or 100 mg/month estradiol undecylate both by intramuscular injection. The solid lines are the average levels and the dashed lines are the highest and lowest observed levels.

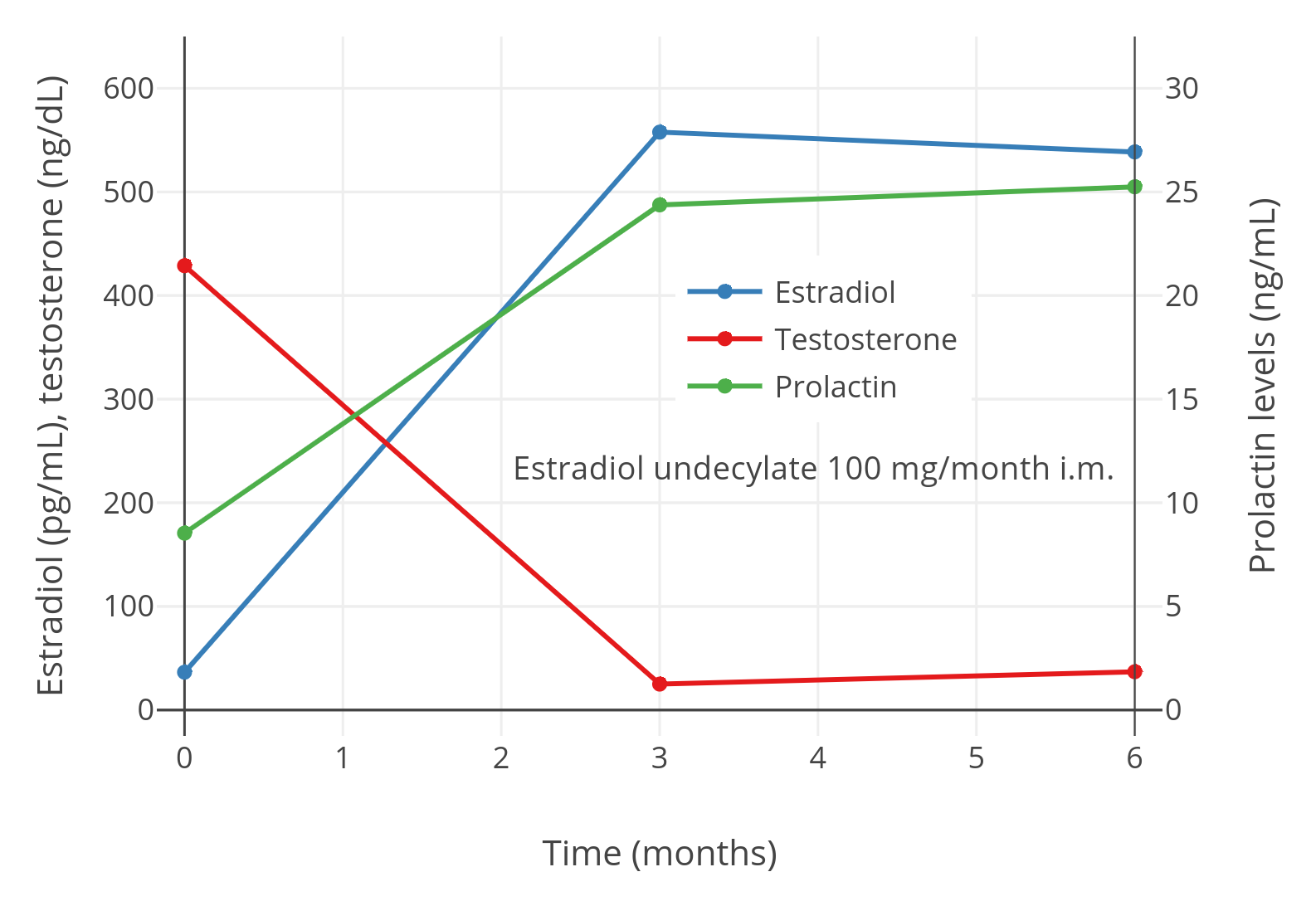
Estradiol, testosterone, and prolactin levels with 100 mg/month estradiol undecylate by intramuscular injection in men with prostate cancer.

A phase III clinical trial comparing high-dose intramuscular cyproterone acetate (300 mg/week) and high-dose intramuscular estradiol undecylate (100 mg/month) in the treatment of prostate cancer found that estradiol undecylate suppressed testosterone levels into the castrate range (< 50 ng/dL) within at least 3 months whereas testosterone levels with cyproterone acetate were significantly higher and above the castrate range even after 6 months of treatment. With estradiol undecylate, testosterone levels fell from 416 ng/dL to 38 ng/mL (–91%) after 3 months and to 29.6 ng/dL (–93%) after 6 months, whereas with cyproterone acetate, testosterone levels fell from 434 ng/dL to 107 ng/mL (–75%) at 3 months and to 102 ng/mL (–76%) at 6 months. In another study using the same dosages, estradiol undecylate suppressed testosterone levels by 97% while CPA suppressed them by 70%. In accordance, whereas estrogens are well-established as able to suppress testosterone levels into the castrate range at sufficiently high dosages, progestogens like cyproterone acetate on their own are able to decrease testosterone levels only up to an apparent maximum of around 70 to 80%. Besides effects on testosterone levels, the long-term effects of estradiol undecylate on testicular morphology in transgender women have been studied.

=== Pharmacokinetics ===
The pharmacokinetics of estradiol undecylate have been assessed limitedly in a few studies. Following a single intramuscular injection of 100 mg estradiol undecylate in oil, mean levels of estradiol were about 500 pg/mL a day after injection and about 340 pg/mL 14 days after injection in 4 people. Levels of estradiol with intramuscular estradiol undecylate were reported to be very irregular and to vary by as much as 10-fold between individuals. In another study, following a single intramuscular injection of 32.2 mg estradiol undecylate, levels of estradiol peaked at around 400 pg/mL after 3 days and decreased from this peak to around 200 pg/mL after 6 days in 3 postmenopausal women. In a repeated administration study of 100 mg per month estradiol undecylate in 14 men with prostate cancer, estradiol levels at trough were about 560 pg/mL at 3 months and about 540 pg/mL at 6 months following initiation of therapy. In a larger follow-up of the study with 21 men, estradiol levels at trough were about 36 pg/mL at baseline, 486 pg/mL at 3 months, and 598 pg/mL at 6 months of therapy. In one further study, levels of estradiol in an unspecified number of postmenopausal women following a single injection of 100 mg estradiol undecylate were said to be between 300 pg/mL and 600 pg/mL six days post-injection.

Due to its more protracted duration, doses of estradiol undecylate that are typical of other estradiol esters produce only "subthreshold" estradiol levels, and for this reason, higher single doses of estradiol undecylate are necessary for similar effects. However, the relatively low levels of estradiol produced by lower doses of estradiol undecylate are favorable for menopausal replacement therapy.

The duration of estradiol undecylate is markedly prolonged relative to that of estradiol benzoate, estradiol valerate, and many other estradiol esters. A single intramuscular injection of 10 to 12.5 mg estradiol undecylate has a duration of 40 to 60 days (~1–2 months) and of 25 to 50 mg estradiol undecylate has an estimated duration of effect of 2 to 4 months in postmenopausal women. A single intramuscular injection of 20 to 30 mg estradiol undecylate has been found to inhibit ovulation when used as an estrogen-only injectable contraceptive in premenopausal women for 1 to 3 months (mean 1.7 months) as well. When used at a higher dose of 100 mg per injection in men with prostate cancer, estradiol undecylate has been given usually once a month. After a single subcutaneous injection of estradiol undecylate in rats, its duration of effect was 80 days (about 2.5 months). Due to its very prolonged duration, estradiol undecylate has been described in general as a favorable alternative to estradiol implants.

The excretion of estradiol undecylate has been studied as well.

Estradiol undecylate has not been used via oral administration. However, a closely related estradiol ester, estradiol decanoate (estradiol decylate), has been studied via the oral route, and has been found to possess significant oral bioavailability, to produce relatively high estradiol levels of about 100 pg/mL after a single 0.5 mg oral dose and about 100 to 150 pg/mL with continuous 0.25 mg/day oral therapy, and to have a much higher estradiol-to-estrone ratio than oral estradiol of about 2:1. It is thought that this is due to absorption of estradiol decanoate by the lymphatic system and a consequent partial bypass of first-pass metabolism in the liver and intestines, which is similarly known to occur with oral testosterone undecanoate.

Hormone levels with estradiol undecylate by intramuscular injection
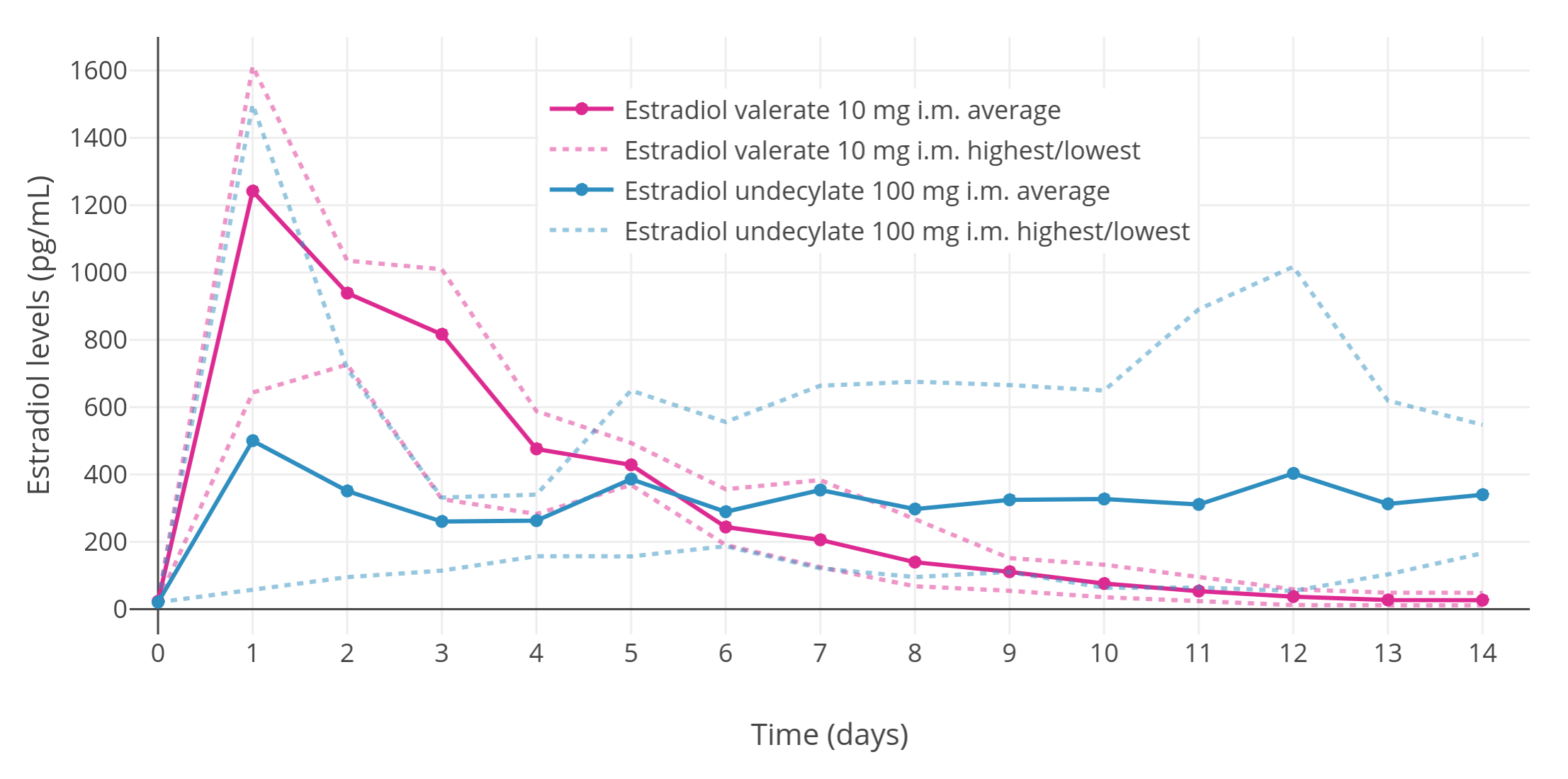
Estradiol levels after a single intramuscular injection of 10 mg estradiol valerate in oil or 100 mg estradiol undecylate in oil both in 4 individuals each. Subject characteristics and assay method were not described. Source was Vermeulen (1975).

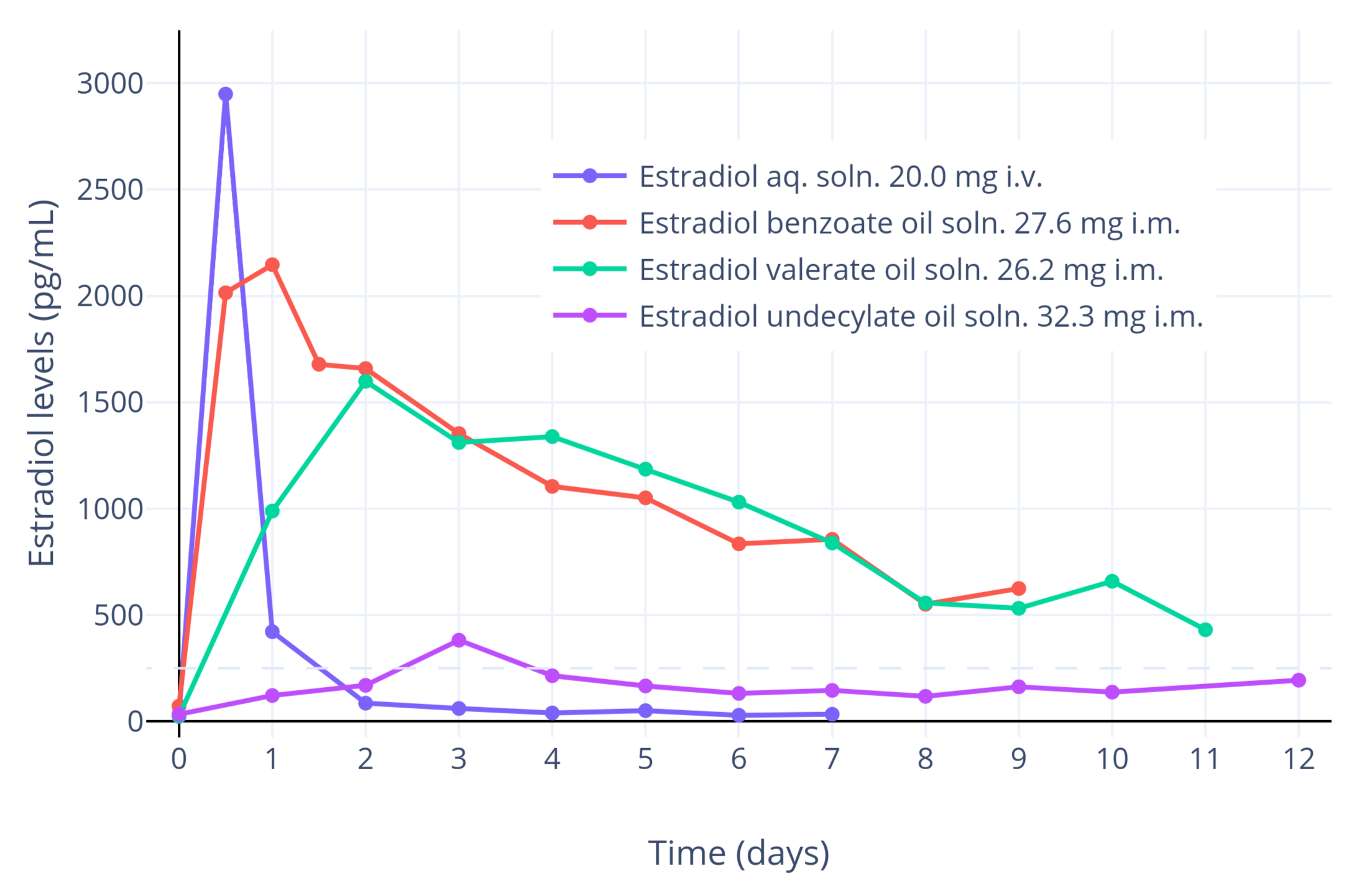
Estradiol levels after a short intravenous infusion of 20 mg estradiol in aqueous solution or an intramuscular injection of equimolar doses of estradiol esters in oil solution in 3 postmenopausal women each. Assays were performed using radioimmunoassay with chromatographic separation. Sources were Geppert (1975) and Leyendecker et al. (1975).

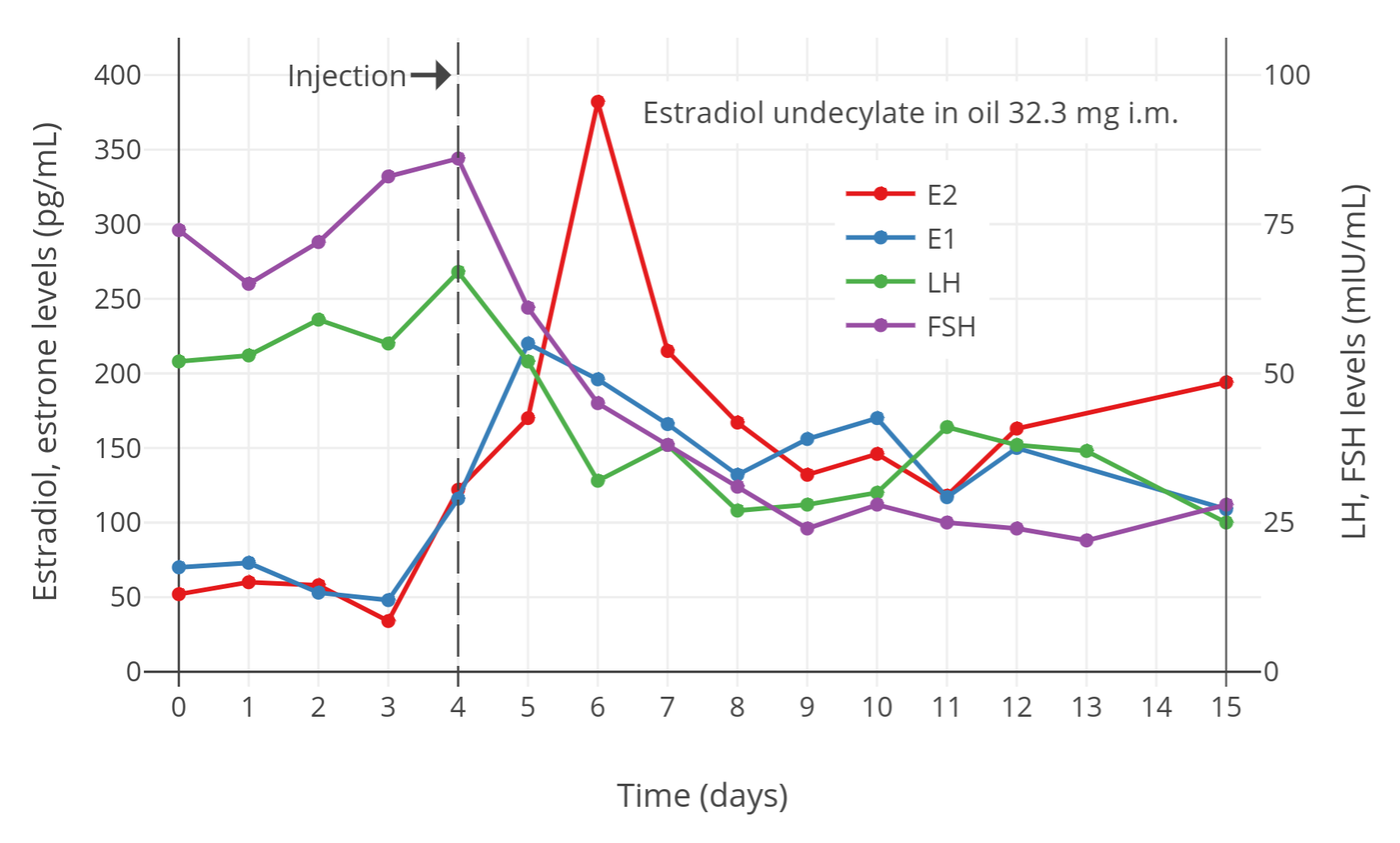
Estradiol, testosterone, luteinizing hormone, and follicle-stimulating hormone levels with an intramuscular injection of 32.3 mg estradiol undecylate in oil in 3 postmenopausal women. Assays were performed using radioimmunoassay with chromatographic separation. Sources were Geppert (1975) and Leyendecker et al. (1975).

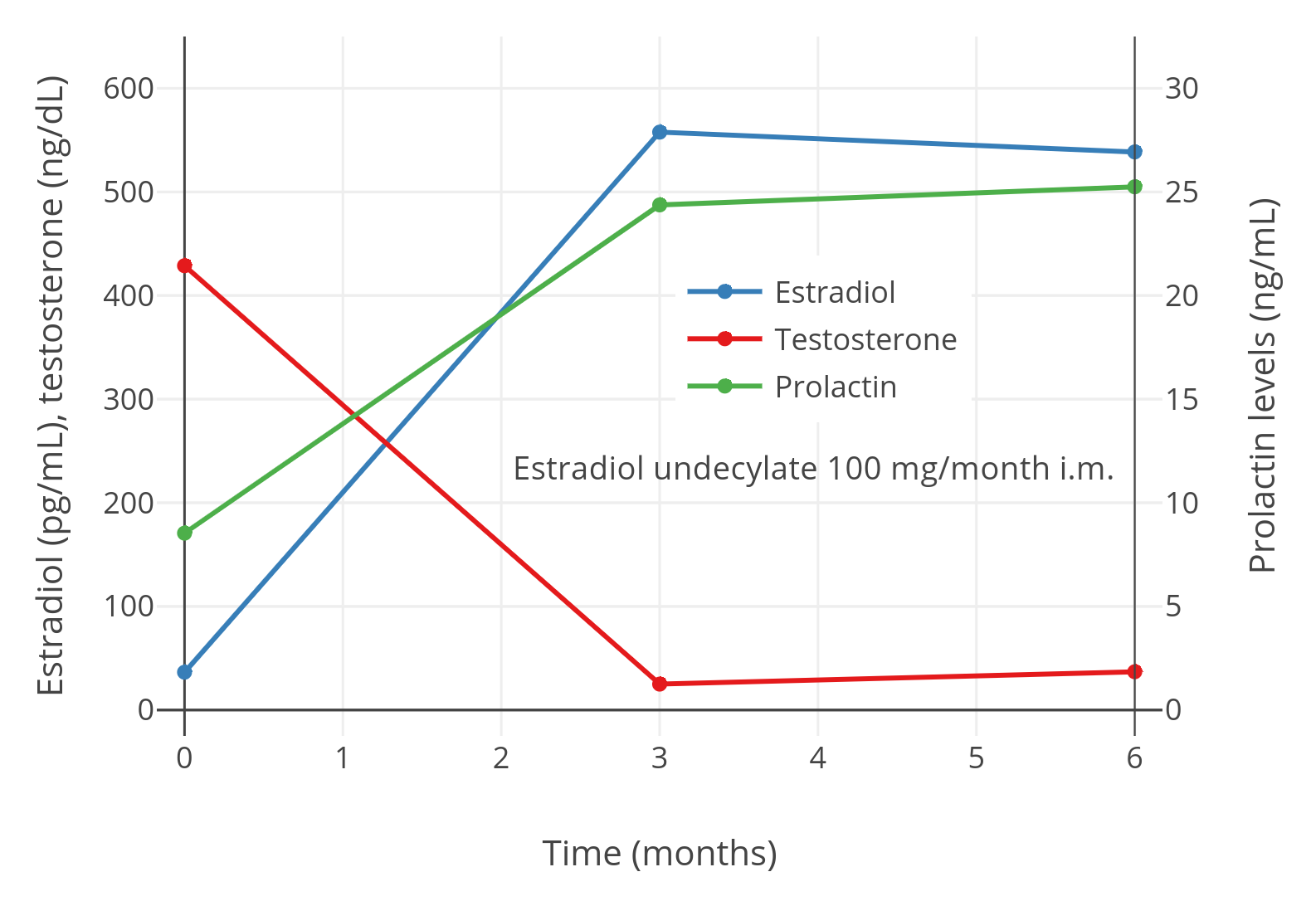
Estradiol, testosterone, and prolactin levels with 100 mg/month estradiol undecylate in oil by intramuscular injection in 14 to 28 men with prostate cancer. A follow-up of the study with more men and with additional hormones was also subsequently published. Sources were Jacobi & Altwein (1979) and Derra (1981).

== Chemistry ==
Estradiol undecylate is a synthetic estrane steroid and an estradiol ester. It is specifically the C17β undecylate (undecanoate) ester of estradiol. The compound is also known as estradiol 17β-undecylate or as estra-1,3,5(10)-triene-3,17β-diol 17β-undecanoate. The undecylic acid (undecanoic acid) ester of estradiol undecylate is a medium-chain fatty acid and is found naturally in many foods, some examples of which include coconut, fruits, fats, oils, and rice.

Estradiol undecylate is a relatively long-chain ester of estradiol. Its undecylate ester contains 11 carbon atoms. For comparison, the ester chains of estradiol acetate, estradiol valerate, and estradiol enantate have 2, 5, and 7 carbon atoms, respectively. As a result of its longer ester chain, estradiol undecylate is the most lipophilic of these estradiol esters, and for this reason, has by far the longest duration when administered in oil solution by intramuscular injection. An example of an estradiol ester with a longer ester chain than estradiol undecylate is estradiol stearate (Depofollan), which has 18 carbon atoms and has been used in medicine as an estrogen as well.

A few estradiol esters related to estradiol undecylate include estradiol decanoate, estradiol diundecylate, and estradiol diundecylenate. Estradiol undecylate shares the same undecylate ester as testosterone undecanoate, an androgen/anabolic steroid and very long-lasting testosterone ester.

Estradiol undecylate is one of the longest-chain steroid esters that has been in common medical use.

Structural properties of selected estradiol esters
Estrogen	Structure	Ester(s)				Relative mol. weight	Relative E2 content^{b}	log P^{c}
Estrogen	Structure	Position(s)	Moiet(ies)	Type	Length^{a}	Relative mol. weight	Relative E2 content^{b}	log P^{c}
Estradiol		–	–	–	–	1.00	1.00	4.0
Estradiol acetate		C3	Ethanoic acid	Straight-chain fatty acid	2	1.15	0.87	4.2
Estradiol benzoate		C3	Benzoic acid	Aromatic fatty acid	– (~4–5)	1.38	0.72	4.7
Estradiol dipropionate		C3, C17β	Propanoic acid (×2)	Straight-chain fatty acid	3 (×2)	1.41	0.71	4.9
Estradiol valerate		C17β	Pentanoic acid	Straight-chain fatty acid	5	1.31	0.76	5.6–6.3
Estradiol benzoate butyrate		C3, C17β	Benzoic acid, butyric acid	Mixed fatty acid	– (~6, 2)	1.64	0.61	6.3
Estradiol cypionate		C17β	Cyclopentylpropanoic acid	Cyclic fatty acid	– (~6)	1.46	0.69	6.9
Estradiol enanthate		C17β	Heptanoic acid	Straight-chain fatty acid	7	1.41	0.71	6.7–7.3
Estradiol dienanthate		C3, C17β	Heptanoic acid (×2)	Straight-chain fatty acid	7 (×2)	1.82	0.55	8.1–10.4
Estradiol undecylate		C17β	Undecanoic acid	Straight-chain fatty acid	11	1.62	0.62	9.2–9.8
Estradiol stearate		C17β	Octadecanoic acid	Straight-chain fatty acid	18	1.98	0.51	12.2–12.4
Estradiol distearate		C3, C17β	Octadecanoic acid (×2)	Straight-chain fatty acid	18 (×2)	2.96	0.34	20.2
Estradiol sulfate		C3	Sulfuric acid	Water-soluble conjugate	–	1.29	0.77	0.3–3.8
Estradiol glucuronide		C17β	Glucuronic acid	Water-soluble conjugate	–	1.65	0.61	2.1–2.7
Estramustine phosphate^{d}		C3, C17β	Normustine, phosphoric acid	Water-soluble conjugate	–	1.91	0.52	2.9–5.0
Polyestradiol phosphate^{e}		C3–C17β	Phosphoric acid	Water-soluble conjugate	–	1.23^{f}	0.81^{f}	2.9^{g}
Footnotes: ^{a} = Length of ester in carbon atoms for straight-chain fatty acids or approximate length of ester in carbon atoms for aromatic or cyclic fatty acids. ^{b} = Relative estradiol content by weight (i.e., relative estrogenic exposure). ^{c} = Experimental or predicted octanol/water partition coefficient (i.e., lipophilicity/hydrophobicity). Retrieved from PubChem, ChemSpider, and DrugBank. ^{d} = Also known as estradiol normustine phosphate. ^{e} = Polymer of estradiol phosphate (~13 repeat units). ^{f} = Relative molecular weight or estradiol content per repeat unit. ^{g} = log P of repeat unit (i.e., estradiol phosphate). Sources: See individual articles.

== History ==
Estradiol undecylate was first described in the scientific literature, along with estradiol valerate and a variety of other estradiol esters, by Karl Junkmann of Schering AG in 1953. It was introduced for medical use via intramuscular injection by 1956. Syntex applied for a patent for estradiol undecylate in 1958, which was granted in 1961 and was given a priority date of 1957. Estradiol undecylate was introduced for medical use and was employed for decades, but was eventually discontinued. It remained in use in some countries as late as the 2000s.

Harry Benjamin reported on the use of estradiol undecylate in transgender women in his book The Transsexual Phenomenon in 1966 and in a literature review in the Journal of Sex Research in 1967.

== Society and culture ==
=== Generic names ===
Estradiol undecylate is the generic name of the drug and its INN and USAN. It is also spelled in some publications as estradiol unducelate and is also known as estradiol undecanoate. In German, it is known under a variety of spellings including as estradiolundecylat, östradiolundecylat, östradiolundezylat, oestradiolundecylat, oestradiolundezylat, and others. Estradiol undecylate is known by its former developmental code names RS-1047 and SQ-9993 as well.

=== Brand names ===
The major brand name of estradiol undecylate is Progynon Depot 100. It has also been marketed under other brand names including Delestrec, Depogin, Estrolent, Oestradiol D, Oestradiol-Retard Theramex, and Primogyn Depot [0,1 mg/ml], among others.

=== Availability ===
Estradiol undecylate was available in the Europe (including in France, Germany, Great Britain, Monaco, the Netherlands, Switzerland), and Japan. However, it has been discontinued and hence is no longer available.

== Research ==
Estradiol undecylate was studied by Schering alone as an estrogen-only injectable contraceptive in premenopausal women at a dose of 20 to 30 mg once a month. It was effective, lacked breast and thromboembolic complications, lacked other side effects besides amenorrhea, and prevented ovulation for 1 to 3 months (mean 1.7 months) following a single dose. However, uterine growth of 1 to 2 cm was observed after one year, and endometrial hyperplasia was occasionally encountered. The preparation was not further developed as a form of birth control due to the risks of endometrial hyperplasia and cancer associated with long-term unopposed estrogen therapy.

Estradiol undecylate, in combination with norethisterone enanthate (at doses of 5 to 10 mg and 50 to 70 mg, respectively), was studied by Schering as a combined injectable contraceptive in premenopausal women and was found to be effective and well-tolerated, but ultimately was not marketed for this use.

== See also ==
- Estradiol undecylate/norethisterone enanthate
