= Polyestradiol phosphate =

Chemical compound

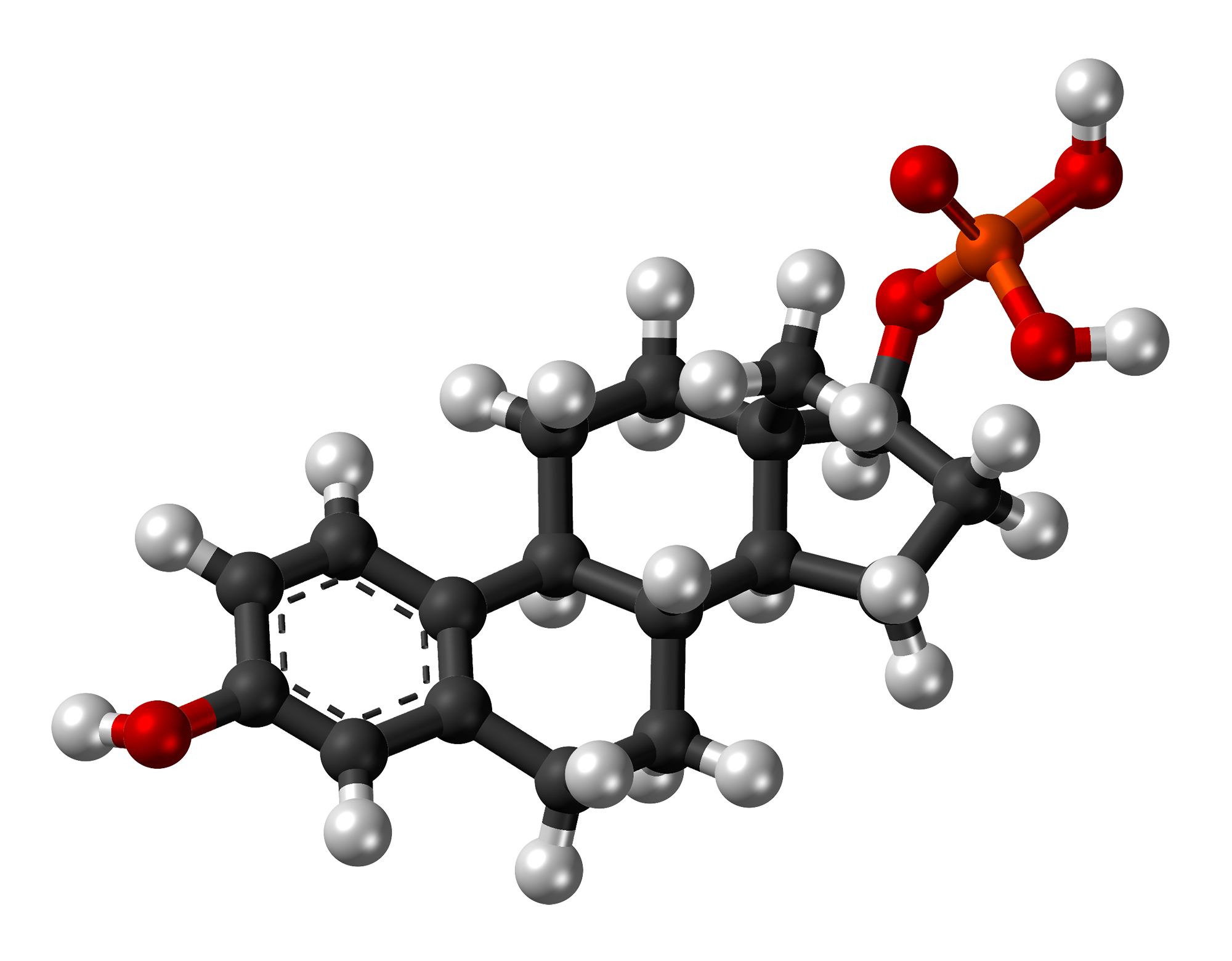
- Skeletal structure of polyestradiol phosphate (top) and ball-and-stick model of estradiol phosphate (one monomer of polyestradiol phosphate) (bottom)

Clinical data
- Trade names: Estradurin, Estradurine
- Other names: PEP; Polymeric estradiol phosphate; Polymeric estradiol 17β-phosphate; Estradiol phosphate polymer; Estradiol 17β-phosphate polymer; Estradiol polymer with phosphoric acid; Leo-114
- AHFS/Drugs.com: International Drug Names
- Pregnancy category: Contraindicated
- Routes of administration: Intramuscular injection
- Drug class: Estrogen; Estrogen ester
- ATC code: L02AA02 (WHO)

Legal status
- Legal status: In general: ℞ (Prescription only)

Pharmacokinetic data
- Bioavailability: IM: High
- Protein binding: Estradiol: ~98% (to albumin and SHBG)
- Metabolism: Mainly in the liver, to a lesser extent in the kidneys, gonads, and muscle (by phosphatases)
- Metabolites: Estradiol, phosphoric acid, and metabolites of estradiol
- Elimination half-life: PEP: 70 days (10 weeks); Estradiol: 1–2 hours
- Excretion: Urine (as conjugates)

Identifiers
- IUPAC name: Estra-1,3,5(10)-triene-3,17β-diol, polymer with phosphoric acid
- CAS Number: 28014-46-2
- PubChem SID: 51091766
- DrugBank: DB09369
- ChemSpider: None
- UNII: P14877CDX2
- KEGG: D07434
- ChEMBL: ChEMBL1201477

Chemical and physical data
- Formula: (C_{18}H_{23}O_{4}P)_{n} (n = variable; n̅ = 13)
- Molar mass: Polymer: Variable; Repeat unit: 334.347 g/mol
- 3D model (JSmol): Interactive image
- Melting point: 195 to 202 °C (383 to 396 °F)
- SMILES: [*]Oc1ccc2[C@H]3CC[C@]4(C)[C@]5(CC[C@H]4[C@@H]3CCc2c1).O5P([*])(=O)O

Polyestradiol phosphate (PEP), sold under the brand name Estradurin, is an estrogen medication which is used primarily in the treatment of prostate cancer in men. It is also used in women to treat breast cancer, as a component of hormone therapy to treat low estrogen levels and menopausal symptoms, and as a component of feminizing hormone therapy for transgender women. It is given by injection into muscle once every four weeks.

Common side effects of PEP include headache, breast tenderness, breast development, feminization, sexual dysfunction, infertility, and vaginal bleeding. PEP is an estrogen and hence is an agonist of the estrogen receptor, the biological target of estrogens like estradiol. It is an estrogen ester in the form of a polymer and is an extremely long-lasting prodrug of estradiol in the body. The biological half-life of PEP is more than two months. Because PEP works by being converted into estradiol, it is considered to be a natural and bioidentical form of estrogen. The safety profile of parenteral estradiol esters like PEP is greatly improved relative to synthetic oral estrogens like ethinylestradiol and diethylstilbestrol.

PEP was discovered around 1953 and was introduced for medical use in the United States in 1957. Along with estradiol undecylate and estradiol valerate, it has been frequently used in the United States and Europe as a parenteral form of estrogen to treat men with prostate cancer. However, it is no longer available in the United States and Europe.

== Medical uses ==
PEP is used as an intramuscular injection for estrogen therapy of prostate cancer in men. It is also used to treat breast cancer in women who are at least 5 years postmenopausal. In addition, PEP is used in hormone replacement therapy for low estrogen levels due to hypogonadism or menopause in women. It is also used in feminizing hormone therapy for transgender women. PEP is a form of high-dose estrogen therapy. After an injection, it very slowly releases the active agent estradiol over at least several months.

PEP has been compared to combined androgen blockade (CAB; castration plus flutamide) for the treatment of prostate cancer in a large randomized clinical trial of 915 patients. At 18.5 months, there was no difference in survival or cardiovascular toxicity between the two treatment modalities. These findings suggest that parenteral forms of estradiol may have similar effectiveness and safety relative to androgen deprivation therapy (ADT) in the treatment of prostate cancer. In addition, estrogens may have significant advantages relative to ADT in terms of bone loss and fractures, hot flashes, sexual function, and quality of life, as well as considerable cost savings with parenteral forms of estradiol compared to GnRH analogue therapy. On the other hand, breast tenderness and gynecomastia occur at very high rates with estrogens, whereas incidences are low with castration and CAB. However, gynecomastia with estrogens is generally only mild-to-moderate in severity and is usually only modestly discomforting. In addition, gynecomastia caused by estrogens can be prevented with prophylactic irradiation of the breasts or can be remediated with mastectomy.

PEP has been studied for the treatment of prostate cancer at dosages of 160 mg/month (three studies) and 240 mg/month (four studies). At a dosage of 160 mg/month, PEP incompletely suppresses testosterone levels, failing to reach the castrate range, and is significantly inferior to orchiectomy in slowing disease progression. Conversely, PEP at a dosage of 240 mg/month results in greater testosterone suppression, into the castrate range similarly to orchiectomy, and is equivalent to orchiectomy in effectiveness.

For prostate cancer in men, PEP is usually given at a dosage of 80 to 320 mg every 4 weeks for the first 2 to 3 months to rapidly build up estradiol levels. Thereafter, to maintain estradiol levels, the dosage is adjusted down usually to 40 to 160 mg every 4 weeks based on clinical findings and laboratory parameters. For breast cancer and low estrogen levels in women, the dosage is 40 to 80 mg every 4 weeks. For transgender women, the dosage is 80 to 160 mg every 4 weeks.

=== Available forms ===
PEP is provided in the form of powder or an aqueous solution in vials and ampoules alone or in combination with mepivacaine and/or nicotinamide (vitamin B_{3}) for administration via intramuscular injection. Mepivacaine is a local anaesthetic and is used to avoid a burning sensation during injection of PEP. Each vial/ampoule of Estradurin contains 80 mg PEP, 5 mg mepivacaine hydrochloride, 40 mg nicotinamide, and 2 mL water.

== Contraindications ==
The contraindications of PEP are largely the same as those of estradiol and include:

- Hypersensitivity to PEP, mepivacaine, or other ingredients
- Known, previous, or suspected breast cancer or other estrogen-dependent malignant tumors (e.g., endometrial cancer)
- Vaginal bleeding of unknown cause or untreated endometrial hyperplasia
- Thrombosis and related, including active thrombophlebitis, former or current venous thromboembolism (deep vein thrombosis, pulmonary embolism), active or recent arterial thromboembolism (e.g., angina, myocardial infarction), or known thrombophilia (e.g., protein C deficiency, protein S deficiency, antithrombin deficiency)
- Severe arrhythmia, hypotension, hypertension, or lipid metabolism disorders
- Cerebrovascular events (i.e., stroke)
- Acute liver disease or previously confirmed liver disease, with abnormal liver function tests or jaundice (e.g., Dubin–Johnson syndrome, Rotor syndrome)
- Severe hepatic dysfunction
- Others including porphyria, sickle cell anemia, otosclerosis, or myasthenia gravis
- Pregnancy, lactation, and breastfeeding

== Side effects ==
Systematic studies of the side effects of PEP are lacking. However, its side effects are assumed to be identical to those of estradiol and other estradiol esters. The side effects of PEP are partially dependent on sex. Common or frequent (>10%) side effects are considered to include headache, abdominal pain, nausea, rash, pruritus, loss of libido, erectile dysfunction, breast tenderness, gynecomastia, feminization, demasculinization, infertility, and vaginal bleeding or spotting. Side effects that occur occasionally or uncommonly (0.1–1%) include sodium and water retention, edema, hypersensitivity, breast tension, depression, dizziness, visual disturbances, palpitations, dyspepsia, erythema nodosum, urticaria, and chest pain. All other side effects of PEP are considered to be rare.

The rare (<0.1%) side effects of PEP are considered to include weight gain, impaired glucose tolerance, mood changes (elation or depression), nervousness, tiredness, headache, migraine, intolerance of contact lenses, hypertension, thrombosis, thrombophlebitis, thromboembolism, heart failure, myocardial infarction, vomiting, bloating, cholestatic jaundice, cholelithiasis, transient increases in transaminases and bilirubin, erythema multiforme, hyperpigmentation, muscle cramps, dysmenorrhea, vaginal discharge, premenstrual-like symptoms, breast enlargement, testicular atrophy, allergic reactions (e.g., urticaria, bronchial asthma, anaphylactic shock) due to mepivacaine, and injection site reactions (e.g., pain, sterile abscesses, inflammatory infiltrates).

As thromboembolic and other cardiovascular complications are associated mainly with synthetic oral estrogens like ethinylestradiol and diethylstilbestrol, they occur much less often with parenteral bioidentical forms of estrogen like PEP.

=== Cardiovascular effects ===
PEP produces minimal undesirable effects on coagulation factors and is thought to increase the risk of blood clots little or not at all. This is in spite of the fact that estradiol levels can reach high concentrations of as much as 700 pg/mL with high-dose (320 mg/month) PEP therapy. It is also in contrast to oral synthetic estrogens such as diethylstilbestrol and ethinylestradiol, which produce marked increases in coagulation factors and high rates of blood clots at the high doses used to achieve castrate levels of testosterone in prostate cancer. The difference between the two types of therapies is due to the bioidentical and parenteral nature of PEP and its minimal influence on liver protein synthesis. PEP might actually reduce the risk of blood clots, due to decreases in levels of certain procoagulatory proteins. Although PEP does not increase the hepatic production or levels of procoagulatory factors, it has been found to significantly decrease levels of the anticoagulatory antithrombin III, which may indicate a potential risk of thromboembolic and cardiovascular complications. On the other hand, PEP significantly increases levels of HDL cholesterol and significantly decreases levels of LDL cholesterol, changes which are thought to protect against coronary artery disease. It appears that PEP may have beneficial effects on cardiovascular health at lower dosages (e.g., 160 mg/day) due to its beneficial effects on HDL and LDL cholesterol levels, but these are overshadowed at higher dosages (e.g., 240 mg/day) due to unfavorable dose-dependent effects on hemostasis, namely antithrombin III levels.

Small early pilot studies of PEP for prostate cancer in men found no cardiovascular toxicity with the therapy. A dosage of PEP of 160 mg/month specifically does not appear to increase the risk of cardiovascular complications. In fact, potential beneficial effects on cardiovascular mortality have been observed at this dosage. However, PEP at a higher dosage of 240 mg/month has subsequently been found in large studies to significantly increase cardiovascular morbidity relative to GnRH modulators and orchiectomy in men treated with it for prostate cancer. The increase in cardiovascular morbidity with PEP therapy is due to an increase in non-fatal cardiovascular events, including ischemic heart disease and heart decompensation, specifically heart failure. Conversely, PEP has not been found to significantly increase cardiovascular mortality relative to GnRH modulators and orchiectomy. Moreover, numerically more patients with preexisting cardiovascular disease were randomized to the PEP group in one large study (17.1% vs. 14.5%; significance not reported), and this may have contributed to the increased incidence of cardiovascular morbidity observed with PEP. In any case, some studies have found that the increased cardiovascular morbidity with PEP is confined mainly to the first one or two years of therapy, whereas one study found consistently increased cardiovascular morbidity across three years of therapy. A longitudinal risk analysis that projected over 10 years suggested that the cardiovascular risks of PEP may be reversed with long-term treatment and that the therapy may eventually result in significantly decreased cardiovascular risk relative to GnRH modulators and orchiectomy, although this has not been confirmed.

The cardiovascular toxicity of PEP is far less than that of oral synthetic estrogens like diethylstilbestrol and ethinylestradiol, which increase the risk of venous and arterial thromboembolism, consequently increase the risk of transient ischemic attack, cerebrovascular accident (stroke), and myocardial infarction (heart attack), and result in substantial increases in cardiovascular mortality. It is thought that the relatively minimal cardiovascular toxicity of parenteral forms of estradiol, like PEP and high-dose transdermal estradiol patches, is due to their absence of effect on hepatic coagulation factors.

== Overdose ==
Acute toxicity studies have not indicated a risk of acute side effects with overdose of PEP. The median lethal dose (LD_{50}) of PEP in mice is approximately 700 mg/kg. PEP has been administered in total amounts of 2,000 to 3,000 mg over several months in patients with cancer without toxicity observed. The most likely sign of overdose is reversible feminization, namely gynecomastia. Other symptoms of estrogen overdosage may include nausea, vomiting, bloating, increased weight, water retention, breast tenderness, vaginal discharge, heavy legs, and leg cramps. These side effects can be diminished by reducing the estrogen dosage. There is no specific antidote for overdose of PEP. Treatment of PEP overdose should be based on symptoms.

== Interactions ==
Known potential interactions of PEP are mostly the same as those of estradiol and include:

- Cytochrome P450 inhibitors, especially of CYP3A4, can reduce the metabolism of estradiol and thereby increase estradiol levels; examples include anti-infectives (e.g., erythromycin, clarithromycin, ketoconazole, itraconazole), cimetidine, and grapefruit juice
- Cytochrome P450 inducers, especially of CYP3A4, can induce the metabolism of estradiol and thereby decrease estradiol levels; examples include anticonvulsants (e.g., phenobarbital, carbamazepine, phenytoin), anti-infectives (rifampicin, rifabutin, nevirapine, and efavirenz), and St. John's wort; in addition, while ritonavir and nelfinavir are known as strong inhibitors, they have an inducing effect in combination with steroid hormones
- Certain antibiotics (e.g., ampicillin, tetracyclines) may decrease estradiol levels by limiting enterohepatic recirculation of estradiol
- Paracetamol (acetaminophen), certain beta blockers (e.g., metoprolol), and some benzodiazepines may increase the effects of PEP
- The coagulation-promoting effects of PEP may enhance those of aminocaproic acid
- Polystyrene phosphate can reduce the effects of anticoagulants
- Estrogens increase thyroxine-binding globulin levels and may result in increased total thyroid hormone levels (but not free thyroid hormone levels in euthyroid individuals); interpretation of thyroid function tests should consider this
- Due to reduced glucose tolerance, there may be an influence on need for insulin or oral antidiabetic medications
- PEP may impair the effects of fibrates (e.g., bezafibrate) and certain nonsteroidal anti-inflammatory drugs (e.g., phenazone)
- Concurrent use of hepatotoxic medications, especially dantrolene, may increase the risk of hepatotoxicity
- Phosphatase inhibitors like levamisole may inhibit the cleavage of PEP into estradiol

Interactions with PEP may be less than with oral estrogens due to the lack of the first-pass through the liver.

== Pharmacology ==
=== Pharmacodynamics ===
Estradiol, the active form of PEP.

PEP is an estradiol ester in the form of a polymer and is an extremely long-lasting prodrug of estradiol. As such, it is an estrogen, or an agonist of the estrogen receptors. PEP has antigonadotropic and functional antiandrogenic effects due to its estrogenic activity. A single repeat unit of PEP, corresponding to estradiol phosphate (minus OH_{2}), is of about 23% higher molecular weight than estradiol due to the presence of its C17β phosphate ester. Because PEP is a prodrug of estradiol, it is considered to be a natural and bioidentical form of estrogen.

PEP is a strong inhibitor of several enzymes, including acid phosphatase, alkaline phosphatase, and hyaluronidase, in vitro. In light of the fact that phosphatases, which cleave PEP into estradiol and phosphoric acid, are present in most tissues in the body, it has been said that the long elimination half-life and slow release of PEP are somewhat surprising. It is thought that PEP may inhibit its own metabolism.

Potencies and durations of natural estrogens by intramuscular injection
Estrogen	Form	Dose (mg)		Duration by dose (mg)
Estrogen	Form	EPD	CICD	Duration by dose (mg)
Estradiol	Aq. soln.	?	–	<1 d
Estradiol	Oil soln.	40–60	–	1–2 ≈ 1–2 d
Estradiol	Aq. susp.	?	3.5	0.5–2 ≈ 2–7 d; 3.5 ≈ >5 d
Estradiol	Microsph.	?	–	1 ≈ 30 d
Estradiol benzoate	Oil soln.	25–35	–	1.66 ≈ 2–3 d; 5 ≈ 3–6 d
Estradiol benzoate	Aq. susp.	20	–	10 ≈ 16–21 d
Estradiol benzoate	Emulsion	?	–	10 ≈ 14–21 d
Estradiol dipropionate	Oil soln.	25–30	–	5 ≈ 5–8 d
Estradiol valerate	Oil soln.	20–30	5	5 ≈ 7–8 d; 10 ≈ 10–14 d; 40 ≈ 14–21 d; 100 ≈ 21–28 d
Estradiol benz. butyrate	Oil soln.	?	10	10 ≈ 21 d
Estradiol cypionate	Oil soln.	20–30	–	5 ≈ 11–14 d
Estradiol cypionate	Aq. susp.	?	5	5 ≈ 14–24 d
Estradiol enanthate	Oil soln.	?	5–10	10 ≈ 20–30 d
Estradiol dienanthate	Oil soln.	?	–	7.5 ≈ >40 d
Estradiol undecylate	Oil soln.	?	–	10–20 ≈ 40–60 d; 25–50 ≈ 60–120 d
Polyestradiol phosphate	Aq. soln.	40–60	–	40 ≈ 30 d; 80 ≈ 60 d; 160 ≈ 120 d
Estrone	Oil soln.	?	–	1–2 ≈ 2–3 d
Estrone	Aq. susp.	?	–	0.1–2 ≈ 2–7 d
Estriol	Oil soln.	?	–	1–2 ≈ 1–4 d
Polyestriol phosphate	Aq. soln.	?	–	50 ≈ 30 d; 80 ≈ 60 d
Notes and sources Notes: All aqueous suspensions are of microcrystalline particle size. Estradiol production during the menstrual cycle is 30–640 µg/d (6.4–8.6 mg total per month or cycle). The vaginal epithelium maturation dosage of estradiol benzoate or estradiol valerate has been reported as 5 to 7 mg/week. An effective ovulation-inhibiting dose of estradiol undecylate is 20–30 mg/month. Sources: See template.

Hormone levels with polyestradiol phosphate by intramuscular injection
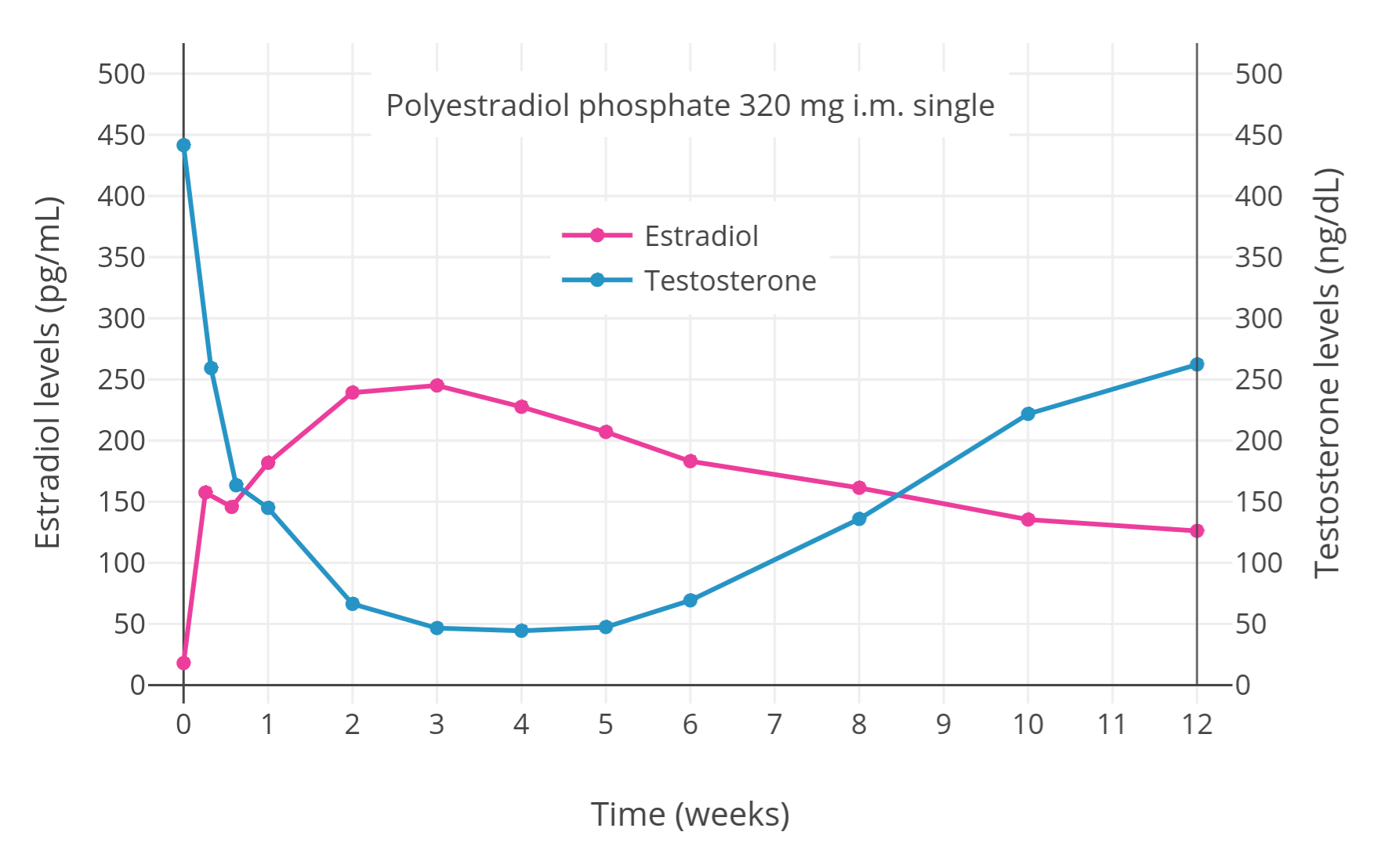
Estradiol and testosterone levels with a single intramuscular injection of 320 mg polyestradiol phosphate in men with prostate cancer.

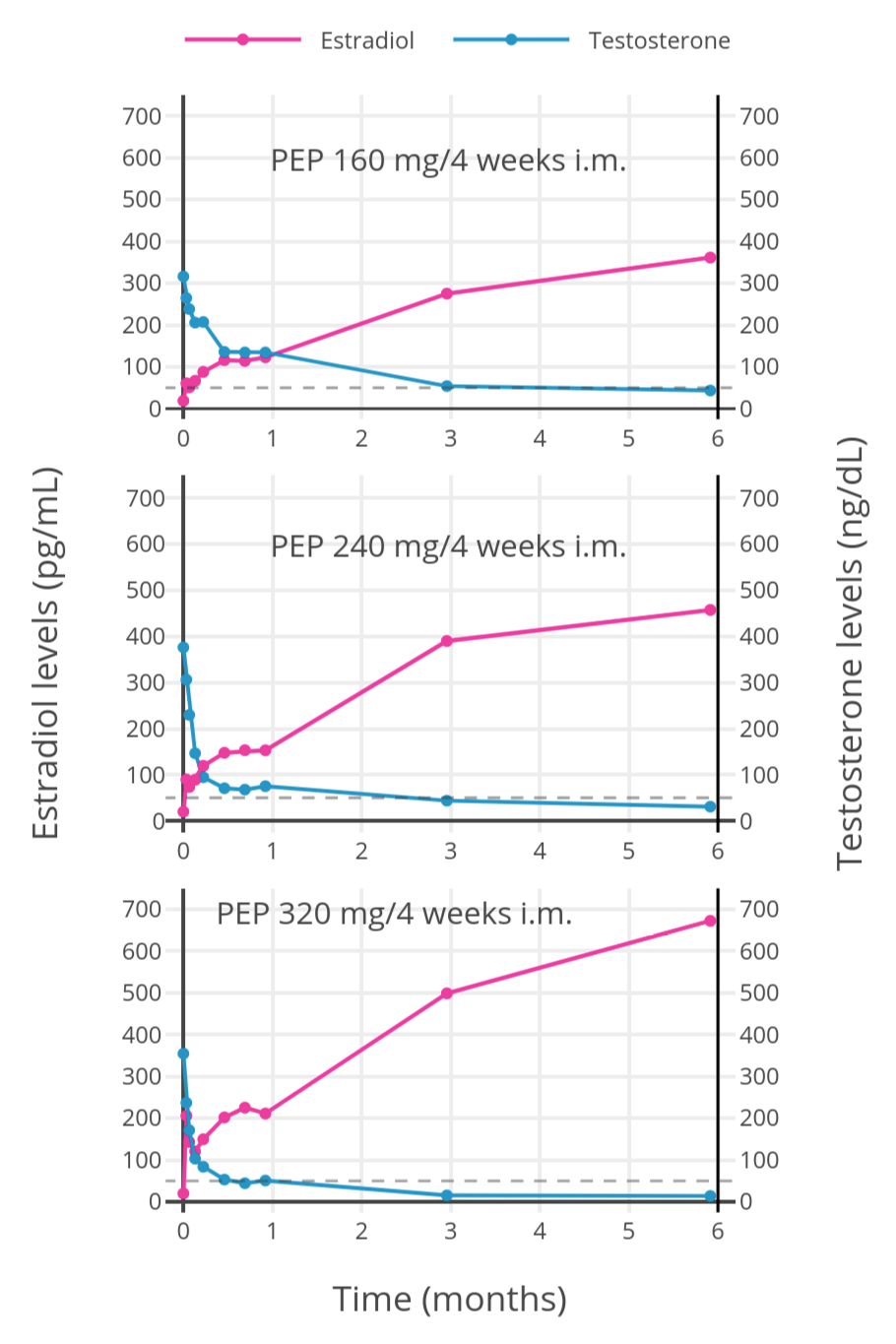
Estradiol and testosterone levels with polyestradiol phosphate 160, 240, or 320 mg once every 4 weeks by intramuscular injection in men with prostate cancer.

==== Antigonadotropic effects ====
PEP has antigonadotropic effects due to its estrogenic activity. It has been found to suppress testosterone levels in men by 55%, 75%, and 85% at intramuscular dosages of 80, 160, and 240 mg every 4 weeks, respectively. A single intramuscular injection of 320 mg PEP in men has been found to suppress testosterone levels to within the castrate range (< 50 ng/dL) within 3 weeks. This was associated with circulating estradiol levels of just over 200 pg/mL. The suppression of testosterone levels that can be achieved with PEP is equal to that with orchiectomy. However, to achieve such concentrations of testosterone, which are about 15 ng/dL on average, higher concentrations of estradiol of around 500 pg/mL were necessary. This was associated with a dosage of intramuscular 320 mg PEP every four weeks and occurred by 90 days of treatment. However, 240 mg PEP every four weeks has also been reported to eventually suppress testosterone levels in the castrate range.

==== Mechanism of action in prostate cancer ====
The growth of prostate cancer is generally stimulated by dihydrotestosterone (DHT), and unless the cancer is castration-resistant, it can be treated by depriving it of androgens. Estradiol produces its therapeutic benefits mainly via exertion of negative feedback on the hypothalamic–pituitary–gonadal axis. This blocks the secretion of luteinizing hormone, which in turn reduces testosterone production in the Leydig cells of the testes. Estradiol also decreases the free percentage of testosterone by increasing sex hormone-binding globulin (SHBG) levels. In addition, it exhibits direct cytotoxicity on prostate cancer cells.

==== Differences from other estrogens ====
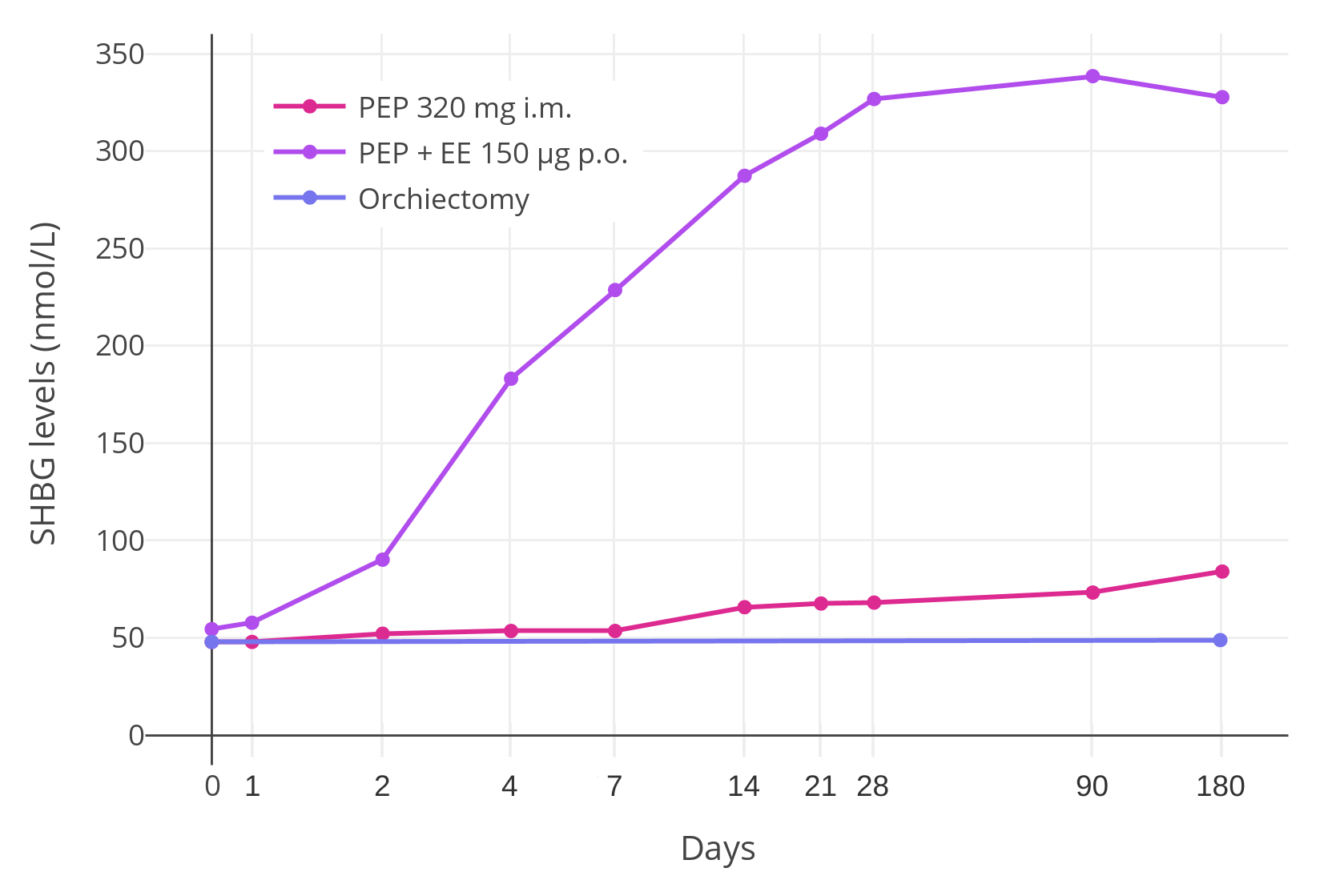
SHBG levels with 1) i.m. injection of 320 mg PEP every 4 weeks; 2) i.m. injection of 320 mg PEP every 4 weeks plus 150 μg/day oral ethinylestradiol; 3) orchiectomy.

Effects of estrogens on coagulation factors
Factors	Oral estrogens^{a}	Parenteral estrogens^{b}
Factor VII	Increases	No change
Factor VIII activity	Increases	No change
Antithrombin III activity	Decreases	Decreases
Prothrombin fragment 1+2	Increases	No change
Activated protein C resistance	Increases	No change
Fibrinogen	Decreases	No change
Footnotes: ^{a} = E.g., DES, EE. ^{b} = PEP. Sources:

Estrogens have effects on liver protein synthesis, including on the synthesis of plasma proteins, coagulation factors, lipoproteins, and triglycerides. These effects can result in an increased risk of thromboembolic and cardiovascular complications, which in turn can result in increased mortality. Studies have found a markedly increased 5-year risk of cardiovascular mortality of 14 to 26% in men treated with oral synthetic estrogens like ethinylestradiol and diethylstilbestrol for prostate cancer. However, whereas oral synthetic estrogens have a strong influence on liver protein synthesis, the effects of parenteral bioidentical estrogens like PEP on liver protein synthesis are comparatively very weak or even completely abolished. This is because the first-pass through the liver with oral administration is avoided and because bioidentical estrogens are efficiently inactivated in the liver. In accordance, PEP has minimal effect on the liver at a dosage of up to at least 240 mg/month.

A study found that whereas 320 mg/month intramuscular PEP increased SHBG levels to 166% in men with prostate cancer, the combination of 80 mg/month intramuscular polyestradiol phosphate and 150 μg/day oral ethinylestradiol increased levels of SHBG to 617%, an almost 8-fold difference in increase and almost 4-fold difference in absolute levels between the two treatment regimens. In addition, whereas there were no cardiovascular complications in the PEP-only group, there was a 25% incidence of cardiovascular complications over the course of a year in the group that was also treated with ethinylestradiol. Another study found no change in levels of coagulation factor VII, a protein of particular importance in the cardiovascular side effects of estrogens, with 240 mg/month intramuscular PEP. These findings demonstrate the enormous impact of synthetic oral estrogens like ethinylestradiol on liver protein production relative to parenteral bioidentical forms of estrogen like PEP.

Originally, PEP was typically used at a dosage of 80 mg per month in combination with 150 μg per day oral ethinylestradiol in the treatment of prostate cancer. This combination was found to produce a considerable incidence of cardiovascular toxicity, and this toxicity was inappropriately attributed to PEP in some publications. Subsequent research has shown that the toxicity is not due to PEP but rather to the ethinylestradiol component.

A study found that therapy with intramuscular PEP resulting in estradiol levels of around 400 pg/mL in men with prostate cancer did not affect growth hormone or insulin-like growth factor 1 levels, whereas the addition of oral ethinylestradiol significantly increased growth hormone levels and decreased insulin-like growth factor 1 levels.

=== Pharmacokinetics ===
PEP has a very long duration and is given by intramuscular injection once every 4 weeks. In men, an initial intramuscular injection of PEP results in a rapid rise in estradiol levels measured at 24 hours followed by a slow and gradual further increase in levels up until at least day 28 (the time of the next injection). Subsequent injections result in a progressive and considerable accumulation in estradiol levels up to at least 6 months. The mean elimination half-life of PEP has been found to be 70 days (10 weeks) with a single 320 mg intramuscular dose of the medication. The t_{max} (time to maximal concentrations) for estradiol was about 16 days. PEP has a duration of approximately 1 month with a single dose of 40 mg, 2 months with 80 mg, and 4 months with 160 mg.

PEP reaches the bloodstream within hours after an injection (90% after 24 hours), where it circulates, and is accumulated in the reticuloendothelial system. Estradiol is then cleaved from the polymer by phosphatases, although very slowly. Levels of estradiol in men with intramuscular injections of PEP once every 4 weeks were about 350 pg/mL with 160 mg, 450 pg/mL with 240 mg, and almost 700 pg/mL with 320 mg, all measured after 6 months of treatment. With monthly injections, steady-state estradiol concentrations are reached after 6 to 12 months. Estradiol is metabolized primarily in the liver by CYP3A4 and other cytochrome P450 enzymes, and is metabolized to a lesser extent in extrahepatic tissues. The metabolites are mainly excreted in urine via the kidneys.

Early studies found that a dosage of 80 mg PEP every 4 weeks rapidly produced relatively high mean estradiol levels of about 400 to 800 pg/mL. These levels are similar to those of 100 mg estradiol undecylate every month, which has been found to produce estradiol levels of around 500 to 600 pg/mL. As a result, it has previously been said that 80 mg PEP per month and 100 mg estradiol undecylate per month are roughly equivalent. However, subsequent studies showed that this dosage of PEP actually achieves much lower estradiol levels than originally demonstrated.

== Chemistry ==
PEP is a synthetic estrane steroid and the C17β phosphoric acid (phosphate) ester of estradiol (estradiol 17β-phosphate) in the form of a polymer. It is also known as estradiol polymer with phosphoric acid or as estradiol 17β-phosphate polymer, as well as estra-1,3,5(10)-triene-3,17β-diol 17β-phosphate polymer. It has been determined via ultracentrifugation that the mean molecular weight of PEP corresponds to a chain length of approximately 13 repeat units of estradiol 17β-phosphate. PEP is closely related to polyestriol phosphate (Gynäsan, Klimadurin, Triodurin) and polytestosterone phloretin phosphate (never commercialized), which are estriol and testosterone esters in the forms of polymers, respectively. It is also related to polydiethylstilbestrol phosphate (never commercialized), a diethylstilbestrol ester in the form of a polymer.

Structural properties of selected estradiol esters
Estrogen	Structure	Ester(s)				Relative mol. weight	Relative E2 content^{b}	log P^{c}
Estrogen	Structure	Position(s)	Moiet(ies)	Type	Length^{a}	Relative mol. weight	Relative E2 content^{b}	log P^{c}
Estradiol		–	–	–	–	1.00	1.00	4.0
Estradiol acetate		C3	Ethanoic acid	Straight-chain fatty acid	2	1.15	0.87	4.2
Estradiol benzoate		C3	Benzoic acid	Aromatic fatty acid	– (~4–5)	1.38	0.72	4.7
Estradiol dipropionate		C3, C17β	Propanoic acid (×2)	Straight-chain fatty acid	3 (×2)	1.41	0.71	4.9
Estradiol valerate		C17β	Pentanoic acid	Straight-chain fatty acid	5	1.31	0.76	5.6–6.3
Estradiol benzoate butyrate		C3, C17β	Benzoic acid, butyric acid	Mixed fatty acid	– (~6, 2)	1.64	0.61	6.3
Estradiol cypionate		C17β	Cyclopentylpropanoic acid	Cyclic fatty acid	– (~6)	1.46	0.69	6.9
Estradiol enanthate		C17β	Heptanoic acid	Straight-chain fatty acid	7	1.41	0.71	6.7–7.3
Estradiol dienanthate		C3, C17β	Heptanoic acid (×2)	Straight-chain fatty acid	7 (×2)	1.82	0.55	8.1–10.4
Estradiol undecylate		C17β	Undecanoic acid	Straight-chain fatty acid	11	1.62	0.62	9.2–9.8
Estradiol stearate		C17β	Octadecanoic acid	Straight-chain fatty acid	18	1.98	0.51	12.2–12.4
Estradiol distearate		C3, C17β	Octadecanoic acid (×2)	Straight-chain fatty acid	18 (×2)	2.96	0.34	20.2
Estradiol sulfate		C3	Sulfuric acid	Water-soluble conjugate	–	1.29	0.77	0.3–3.8
Estradiol glucuronide		C17β	Glucuronic acid	Water-soluble conjugate	–	1.65	0.61	2.1–2.7
Estramustine phosphate^{d}		C3, C17β	Normustine, phosphoric acid	Water-soluble conjugate	–	1.91	0.52	2.9–5.0
Polyestradiol phosphate^{e}		C3–C17β	Phosphoric acid	Water-soluble conjugate	–	1.23^{f}	0.81^{f}	2.9^{g}
Footnotes: ^{a} = Length of ester in carbon atoms for straight-chain fatty acids or approximate length of ester in carbon atoms for aromatic or cyclic fatty acids. ^{b} = Relative estradiol content by weight (i.e., relative estrogenic exposure). ^{c} = Experimental or predicted octanol/water partition coefficient (i.e., lipophilicity/hydrophobicity). Retrieved from PubChem, ChemSpider, and DrugBank. ^{d} = Also known as estradiol normustine phosphate. ^{e} = Polymer of estradiol phosphate (~13 repeat units). ^{f} = Relative molecular weight or estradiol content per repeat unit. ^{g} = log P of repeat unit (i.e., estradiol phosphate). Sources: See individual articles.

=== Solubility ===
PEP is of very low solubility in water, acetone, chloroform, dioxane, and ethanol, but dissolves readily in bases, especially in aqueous pyridine.

=== Synthesis ===
Like polyphosphates of polyphenols, PEP can be prepared from the monomer (in this case estradiol) and phosphoryl chloride. The latter reacts with both the phenolic hydroxyl group in position 3 and the aliphatic one in position 17β. The molecular mass of the resulting polymer can be controlled by interrupting the reaction after a given time: the longer the reaction is allowed to continue, the higher the mass.

== History ==
Pharmacological experiments on estradiol phosphates conducted around 1950 gave rise to the hypothesis that estradiol 3,17β-diphosphate acted as an inhibitor of kidney alkaline phosphatase. When the same scientists wanted to synthesize simple phosphates of phloretin, a compound found in apple tree leaves, they accidentally created a polymer instead. This was later shown to exhibit the same anti-phosphatase properties as estradiol diphosphate, and so it was hypothesized that the original finding was due to contamination with estradiol phosphate polymers. Consequently, these polymers were studied in more detail, which resulted in the development of PEP as early as 1953 and its subsequent introduction for medical use in 1957 in the United States. PEP remained on the market in the United States until at least 2000. It was last known to be marketed in European countries in 2018 but was eventually discontinued in most or all other countries.

== Society and culture ==
=== Generic names ===
Polyestradiol phosphate is the generic name of the drug and its INN and BAN. It is also known by its developmental code name Leo-114.

=== Brand names ===
PEP was marketed exclusively under the brand name Estradurin or Estradurine.

=== Availability ===
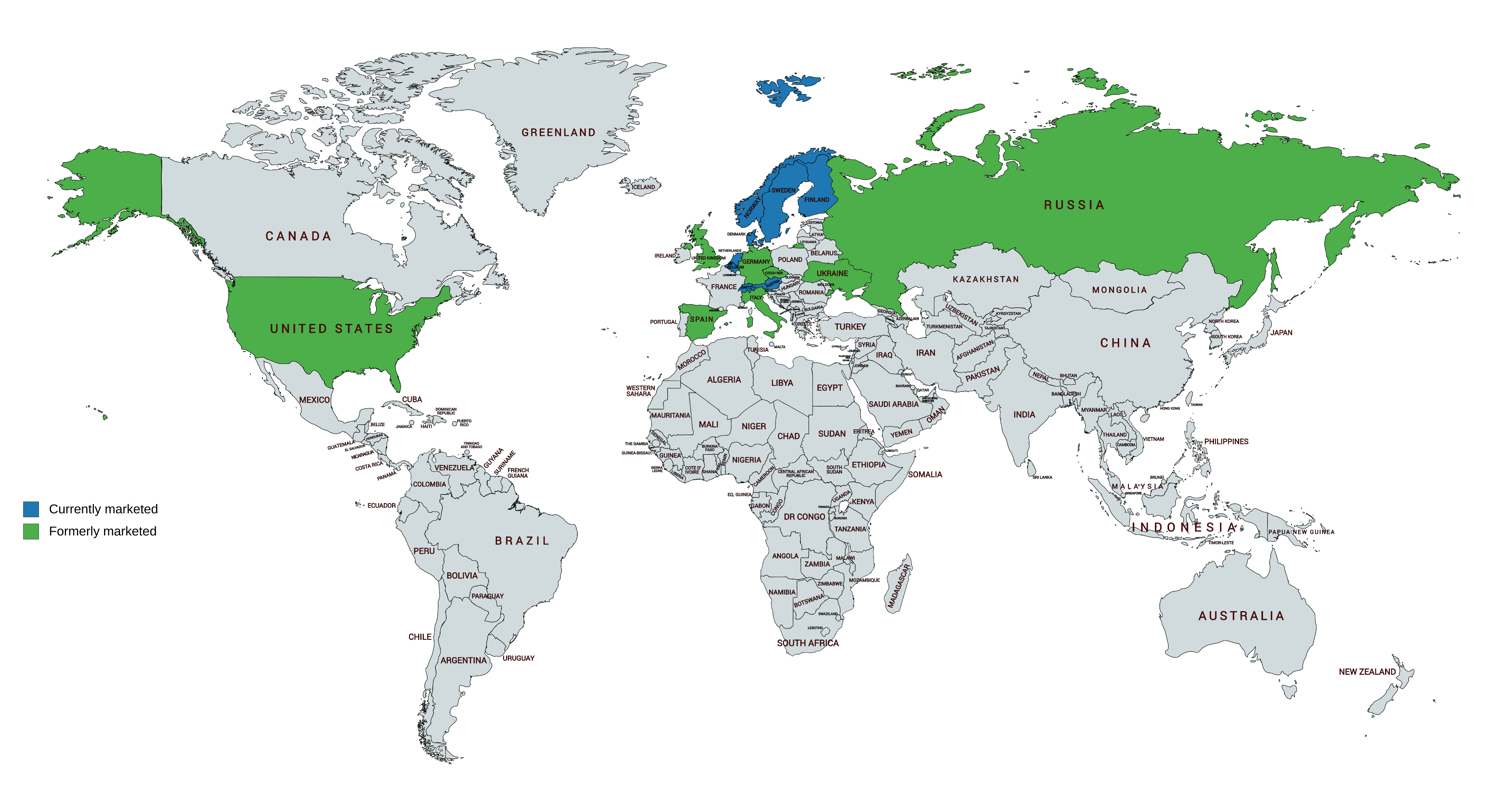
Availability of polyestradiol phosphate in countries throughout the world as of March 2018. Blue is currently marketed, green is formerly marketed.

PEP has been marketed in the United States and widely throughout Europe, including in Austria, Belgium, the Czech Republic, Denmark, Finland, Germany, Italy, the Netherlands, Norway, Russia, Spain, Sweden, Switzerland, Ukraine, and the United Kingdom. It is no longer available in the United States and Europe.

== Research ==
PEP has been studied as a means of hormonal breast enhancement in women.

A combination of PEP and medroxyprogesterone acetate was studied in women as a long-lasting combined injectable contraceptive for use by intramuscular injection once every three months.

== See also ==
- Polyestradiol phosphate/medroxyprogesterone acetate
