= C28H42O3 =

The molecular formula C_{28}H_{42}O_{3} (molar mass: 426.641 g/mol, exact mass: 426.3134 u) may refer to:

- Estradiol decanoate (E2D)
- Testosterone cyclohexylpropionate
