= Estradiol undecylate/norethisterone enanthate =

Combination drug

Estradiol undecylate / norethisterone enanthate

- Estradiol undecylate (top) and norethisterone enanthate (bottom)

Combination of
- Estradiol undecylate: Estrogen
- Norethisterone enanthate: Progestogen

Clinical data
- Other names: EU/NETE
- Routes of administration: Intramuscular injection

Estradiol undecylate/norethisterone enanthate (EU/NETE) is a combination medication of estradiol undecylate (EU), an estrogen, and norethisterone enanthate (NETE), a progestin, which was developed by Schering for potential use as a combined injectable contraceptive in women but was ultimately never marketed. It contained 5 to 10 mg EU and 50 to 70 mg NETE in oil solution and was intended for use by intramuscular injection at regular intervals. Although never commercialized, EU/NETE was found to be effective and well tolerated.

== See also ==
- Polyestradiol phosphate/medroxyprogesterone acetate
- List of combined sex-hormonal preparations § Estrogens and progestogens
