= Polyestradiol phosphate/medroxyprogesterone acetate =

Combination drug

Polyestradiol phosphate / medroxyprogesterone acetate

- Polyestradiol phosphate (top) and medroxyprogesterone acetate (bottom)

Combination of
- Polyestradiol phosphate: Estrogen
- Medroxyprogesterone acetate: Progestogen

Clinical data
- Other names: PEP/MPA
- Routes of administration: Intramuscular injection

Polyestradiol phosphate/medroxyprogesterone acetate (PEP/MPA) is a combination of polyestradiol phosphate (PEP), an estrogen, and medroxyprogesterone acetate (MPA), a progestin, which was studied in the 1960s as a long-lasting combined injectable contraceptive for women but was never marketed. It was administered by intramuscular injection once every 3 months and contained 40 mg PEP and 150 mg MPA. The combination was studied in a sample of 99 premenopausal women and was found to be effective in preventing pregnancy, but caused menstrual irregularities similar to those of MPA alone as a progestogen-only injectable contraceptive. PEP was included in the formulation to prevent estrogen deficiency and reduce menstrual abnormalities caused by MPA during long-term contraceptive therapy.

== See also ==
- Estradiol undecylate/norethisterone enanthate
- List of combined sex-hormonal preparations § Estrogens and progestogens
