= Testosterone phosphate =

Chemical compound

Clinical data
- Trade names: Telipex Aquosum
- Other names: Testosterone 17β-phosphate; Testosterone 17β-(dihydrogen phosphate)
- Routes of administration: Intramuscular injection

Identifiers
- IUPAC name: [(8R,9S,10R,13S,14S,17S)-10,13-dimethyl-3-oxo-1,2,6,7,8,9,11,12,14,15,16,17-dodecahydrocyclopenta[a]phenanthren-17-yl] dihydrogen phosphate
- CAS Number: 1242-14-4
- PubChem CID: 9929198
- ChemSpider: 8104829
- UNII: HNC82VV8K8

Chemical and physical data
- Formula: C_{19}H_{29}O_{5}P
- Molar mass: 368.410 g·mol^{−1}
- 3D model (JSmol): Interactive image
- SMILES: C[C@]12CC[C@H]3[C@H]([C@@H]1CC[C@@H]2OP(=O)(O)O)CCC4=CC(=O)CC[C@]34C
- InChI: InChI=1S/C19H29O5P/c1-18-9-7-13(20)11-12(18)3-4-14-15-5-6-17(24-25(21,22)23)19(15,2)10-8-16(14)18/h11,14-17H,3-10H2,1-2H3,(H2,21,22,23)/t14-,15-,16-,17-,18-,19-/m0/s1; Key:NWJXKHVJFGAOMY-DYKIIFRCSA-N

Testosterone phosphate (brand name Telipex Aquosum) is an androgen and anabolic steroid and a testosterone ester. Its structure is contained within polytestosterone phloretin phosphate.
