= Polydiethylstilbestrol phosphate =

Chemical compound

Clinical data
- Other names: PSP; PDSP; Diethylstilbestrol polymer with phosphoric acid; (E)-4,4'-(1,2-Diethyl-1,2-ethenediyl)bis(phenol) polymer with phosphoric acid
- Routes of administration: Intramuscular injection
- Drug class: Estrogen; Nonsteroidal estrogen; Estrogen ester

Identifiers
- CAS Number: 30852-64-3

Chemical and physical data
- Formula: (C_{18}H_{19}O_{4}P)_{n}

Polydiethylstilbestrol phosphate (PSP, PDSP) is an estrogen medication which has been used in scientific research and has been studied for use in veterinary medicine as a livestock growth promoter. It is a phosphate ester of diethylstilbestrol (DES) in the form of a polymer and is a polymeric form of fosfestrol (diethylstilbestrol diphosphate); PDSP acts as a long-lasting prodrug of DES. It has similarities to polyestradiol phosphate and polyestriol phosphate.

== See also ==
- List of estrogen esters § Diethylstilbestrol esters
- Polytestosterone phloretin phosphate
