= Polytestosterone phloretin phosphate =

Androgen and anabolic steroid

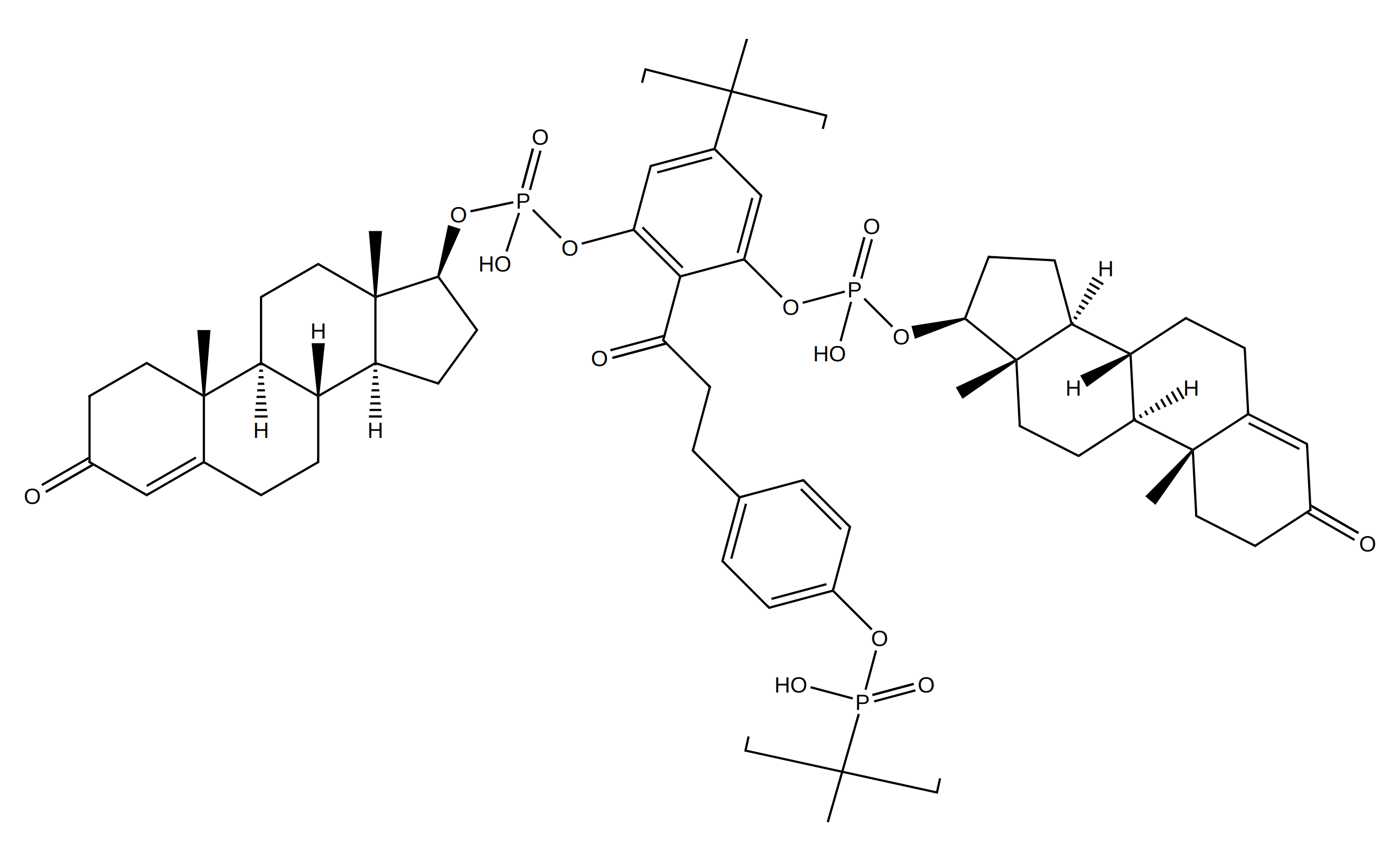
- A single repeat unit of polytestosterone phloretin phosphate. A phloretin moiety esterified with two testosterone phosphate moieties and with a phosphoric acid linker.

Clinical data
- Other names: Polytestosteronephloretin phosphate; PTPP; Poly-testosterone phosphate coupled with phloretin
- Routes of administration: Injection
- Drug class: Androgen; Anabolic steroid; Androgen ester

Polytestosterone phloretin phosphate (PTPP) is an androgen and anabolic steroid as well as androgen ester which was never marketed. It is an ester of testosterone with phosphoric acid that is in the form of a polymer and is coupled with phloretin. Like other androgen esters, PTPP acts as a long-lasting prodrug of testosterone in the body. However, analogously to the polymeric estrogen esters polyestradiol phosphate (PEP), polyestriol phosphate (PE3P), and polydiethylstilbestrol phosphate (PSP), PTPP has a strongly prolonged duration with very uniform testosterone levels in animals compared to non-polymeric testosterone esters. According to its developers, this is "exactly the effect which should be aimed at in order to approach natural hormone production as closely as possible". PTPP was developed around 1953 at the same time as PEP and its patent was published in 1960. The patent was assigned to the Swedish pharmaceutical company Leo Läkemedel AB, which also developed PEP.

PEP is a linear polymer of on average 13 repeat units of estradiol phosphate. Each individual estradiol unit in the molecule is connected by its C3 and C17β hydroxyl groups to phosphoric acid linkers that are present between the estradiol moieties. In contrast to estradiol, such a polymer is not possible with testosterone because testosterone has only one hydroxyl group and hence does not have the two hydroxyl groups necessary for linking the testosterone units together. In PTPP, phloretin is used as a coupling agent to solve this problem and create a testosterone phosphate polymer. Phloretin has four available hydroxyl groups present in its chemical structure. A linear polymer of phloretin with phosphoric acid linkers is present as the backbone of the molecule, and testosterone moieties are connected to the free third and fourth hydroxyl groups of each phloretin unit also with phosphoric acid linkers. As such, two testosterone moieties essentially "hang" or "dangle off" of each phloretin unit in the polymer, and these testosterone moieties are slowly cleaved from the polymer.

== See also ==
- List of androgen esters § Testosterone esters
