= High-dose estrogen therapy =

Type of hormone therapy

- Drug class
- Estradiol valerate, an estrogen which has been used as a means of HDE

Class identifiers
- Synonyms: Pseudopregnancy (when used in combination with a progestogen)
- ATC code: G03C
- Biological target: Estrogen receptors (ERα, ERβ, mERs (e.g., GPER, others))
- Chemical class: Steroidal; Nonsteroidal

Legal status

High-dose estrogen therapy (HDE) is a type of hormone therapy in which high doses of estrogens are given. When given in combination with a high dose of progestogen, it has been referred to as pseudopregnancy. It is called this because the estrogen and progestogen levels achieved are in the range of the very high levels of these hormones that occur during pregnancy. HDE and pseudopregnancy have been used in medicine for a number of hormone-dependent indications, such as breast cancer, prostate cancer, and endometriosis, among others. Both natural or bioidentical estrogens and synthetic estrogens have been used and both oral and parenteral routes may be used.

== Medical uses ==
HDE and/or pseudopregnancy have been used in clinical medicine for the following indications:

- Estrogen receptor-positive breast cancer in women
- As a means of androgen deprivation therapy for prostate cancer and benign prostatic hyperplasia in men
- In combination with progestins for endometriosis in women. Although initially used alone, progestins were added in the 1960s and 1970s. In addition, the estrogen diethylstilbestrol is an example of medical reversal as it increases the risk of endometriosis in the treated women and in their female children.
- Osteopenia and osteoporosis in women
- Prevention of tall stature in tall adolescent girls
- Suppression of IGF-1 levels in acromegaly and gigantism
- As a component of hormone therapy for transgender women to achieve feminization and suppress androgens
- Breast hypoplasia or as a means of hormonal breast enhancement in women
- Uterine hypoplasia in women
- Premenstrual syndrome and premenstrual dysphoric disorder in women
- Postpartum depression and psychosis in women

The nonsteroidal estrogen diethylstilbestrol as well as other stilbestrols were previously used to support pregnancy and reduce the risk of miscarriage, but subsequent research found that diethylstilbestrol was both ineffective and teratogenic.

HDE should be combined with a progestogen in women with an intact uterus as unopposed estrogen, particularly at high dosages, increases the risk of endometrial hyperplasia and endometrial cancer. The majority of women with an intact uterus will develop endometrial hyperplasia within a few years of estrogen treatment even with mere replacement dosages of estrogen if a progestogen is not taken concomitantly. The addition of a progestogen to estrogen abolishes the increase in risk.

=== Available forms ===
The following steroidal estrogens have been used in HDE therapy:

- Conjugated estrogens (Premarin)
- Estradiol and estradiol esters (e.g., estradiol benzoate, estradiol undecylate, estradiol valerate, polyestradiol phosphate)
- Estramustine phosphate (an estradiol ester that is also a cytostatic antineoplastic agent; used for prostate cancer only)
- Ethinylestradiol, its ether mestranol, and its ester ethinylestradiol sulfonate

As well as the following nonsteroidal estrogens (which are now little or not at all used):

- Diethylstilbestrol (stilbestrol), fosfestrol (diethylstilbestrol diphosphate), bifluranol, and other stilbestrols

Progestogens that have been used in pseudopregnancy regimens include hydroxyprogesterone caproate, medroxyprogesterone acetate, and cyproterone acetate, among others. Progesterone has been little-used for such purposes likely due to its poor pharmacokinetics (e.g., low oral bioavailability and short elimination half-life).

== Side effects ==
General adverse effects of HDE may include breast enlargement, breast pain and tenderness, nipple enlargement and hyperpigmentation, nausea and vomiting, headache, fluid retention, edema, melasma, hyperprolactinemia, galactorrhea, amenorrhea, reversible infertility, and others. More uncommon but serious side effects may include thrombus and thrombosis (e.g., venous thromboembolism), other cardiovascular events (e.g., myocardial infarction, stroke), prolactinoma, cholestatic jaundice, gallbladder disease, and gallstones. In women, HDE may cause amenorrhea and rarely endometrial hyperplasia or endometrial cancer, but the risk of adverse endometrial changes is minimized or offset with pseudopregnancy regimens due to the progestogen component. The tolerability profile of HDE is worse in men compared to women. Side effects of HDE specific to men may include gynecomastia (breast development), feminization and demasculinization in general (e.g., reduced body hair, decreased muscle mass and strength, feminine changes in fat mass and distribution, and reduced penile and testicular size), and sexual dysfunction (e.g., reduced libido and erectile dysfunction).

The use of HDE in men has been associated with cellulite, which has been attributed to androgen deficiency.

== Pharmacology ==
Estrogens are agonists of the estrogen receptors (ERs), the biological target of endogenous estrogens such as estradiol. When used in high doses, estrogens are powerful antigonadotropins, strongly inhibiting secretion of the gonadotropins luteinizing hormone and follicle-stimulating hormone from the pituitary gland, and in men are able to completely suppress gonadal androgen production and reduce testosterone levels into the castrate range. This is most of the basis of their use in prostate cancer and benign prostatic hyperplasia. When estradiol or an estradiol ester is used for HDE in men, levels of estradiol of at least approximately 200 pg/mL are necessary to suppress testosterone levels into the castrate range.

Synthetic and nonsteroidal estrogens like ethinylestradiol and diethylstilbestrol are resistant to hepatic metabolism and for this reason have dramatically increased local potency in the liver. As a result, they have disproportionate effects on hepatic protein production and a greatly increased risk of blood clots relative to endogenous and bioidentical forms of estrogen like estradiol and estradiol esters. Unlike synthetic estrogens, bioidentical estrogens are efficiently inactivated in the liver even at high dosages or high circulating levels, as in pregnancy, although changes in hepatic protein production can still occur.

A study that used high- to very-high-dose oral estradiol to treat postmenopausal women with estrogen receptor-positive breast cancer found that mean steady-state estradiol levels in the 6 mg/day group were about 300 pg/mL and in the 30 mg/day group were about 2,400 pg/mL. An example pseudopregnancy regimen in women which has been used in clinical studies is intramuscular injections of 40 mg/week estradiol valerate and 250 mg/week hydroxyprogesterone caproate. It has been found to result in estradiol levels of about 3,100 pg/mL at 3 months of therapy and 2,500 pg/mL at 6 months of therapy.

Levels of estrogen and progesterone in normal human pregnancy are very high. Estradiol levels are 1,000 to 5,000 pg/mL during the first trimester, 5,000 to 15,000 pg/mL during the second trimester, and 10,000 to 40,000 pg/mL during the third trimester, with a mean of 25,000 pg/mL at term and levels as high as 75,000 pg/mL measurable in some women. Levels of progesterone are 10 to 50 ng/mL in the first trimester and rise to 50 to 280 ng/mL in the third trimester, with a mean of around 150 ng/mL at term. Although only a small fraction of estradiol and progesterone are unbound in circulation, the amounts of free and thus biologically active estradiol and progesterone increase to similarly large extents as total levels during pregnancy. As such, pregnancy is a markedly hyperestrogenic and hyperprogestogenic state. Levels of estradiol and progesterone are both up to 100-fold higher during pregnancy than during normal menstrual cycling.

Pseudopregnancy simulates the hormonal profile of the first trimester of pregnancy.

== History ==
HDE has been used since the discovery and introduction of estrogens in the 1930s. It was first found to be effective in the treatment of prostate cancer in 1941 and in the treatment of breast cancer in 1944. HDE was the first medical therapy for prostate cancer and breast cancer. Pseudopregnancy was developed in the 1950s following the introduction of progestins with improved potency and pharmacokinetics, at which time it was used to treat hypoplasia of the uterus and breasts and endometriosis. In modern times, pseudopregnancy is rarely used. However, studies in the mid-1990s were conducted and found it to be rapidly effective for increasing bone mineral density in women with osteopenia due to hypoestrogenism. HDE has also commonly been used in transgender women since the 1960s.

Oral HDE for prostate cancer with diethylstilbestrol was used widely in men with prostate cancer until the mid-1960s, when it was compared directly to orchiectomy and was associated with improved cancer-related mortality but worse overall survival, mainly due to previously unrecognized cardiovascular side effects. As a result of this study, HDE for prostate cancer fell out of favor. However, in recent times there has been a resurgence in interest of HDE for prostate cancer with safer, bioidentical and parenteral forms of estrogen that don't share the same risks, including polyestradiol phosphate and transdermal estradiol. Modern HDE for prostate cancer has a variety of advantages and benefits over conventional androgen deprivation therapy with castration, including fewer side effects like osteoporosis, hot flashes, and impairment in cognitive, emotional, and sexual domains, potentially superior quality of life, and considerable cost savings. The main drawback of modern HDE for prostate cancer is a high incidence of gynecomastia of about 40 to 77%, although it is generally only mildly or modestly discomforting. In addition, prophylactic irradiation of the breasts can be used to prevent it and has minimal side effects, mostly consisting of temporary skin discoloration.

Following continued clinical research after the discovery of the effectiveness of HDE for breast cancer in 1944, HDE, most commonly with diethylstilbestrol and to a lesser extent ethinylestradiol, became the standard of care for the treatment of breast cancer in postmenopausal women from the early 1960s onwards. In the 1970s, the antiestrogen tamoxifen was found to be effective for the treatment of breast cancer and was introduced for medical use. Comparative studies found that the two therapies showed equivalent effectiveness, but that tamoxifen had reduced toxicity. As a result, antiestrogen therapy became the first-line treatment for breast cancer and almost completely replaced HDE. However, in the 1990s, HDE was revisited for breast cancer and was found to be effective in the treatment of women with acquired resistance to antiestrogen therapy. Since then, research on HDE for breast cancer has continued, and safer, bioidentical forms of estrogen like estradiol and estradiol valerate have also been studied and found to be effective. A major review was published in 2017 summarizing the literature to date.

== Research ==
Pseudopregnancy has been suggested for use in decreasing the risk of breast cancer in women, though this has not been assessed in clinical studies. Natural pregnancy before the age of 20 has been associated with a 50% lifetime reduction in the risk of breast cancer. Pseudopregnancy has been found to produce decreases in risk of mammary gland tumors in rodents similar to those of natural pregnancy, implicating high levels of estrogen and progesterone in this effect.

== See also ==
- Hormone replacement therapy
- Estrogen deprivation therapy
- Hyperestrogenism
