= Nipple pigmentation =

Darkening of the nipple or areola

- Other names: Areolar pigmentation
- Specialty: Dermatology

Nipple pigmentation or areolar pigmentation is pigmentation (darkening) of the nipple or areola. It is dose-dependently induced as an effect of estrogens and can occur normally during pregnancy and breastfeeding or as a side effect of high-dose estrogen therapy.

== Hyperkeratosis of Nipple and Areola ==
Hyperkeratosis is a condition in which there is a development of a warty thickening and pigmentation of the nipple, areola or both. It is an uncommon skin condition, with only 150 reported cases to date. It may occur in both genders. However, 80% of the cases have been reported in females primarily within the third decade of life. Since the skin lesions are mostly asymptomatic which do not require urgent medical attention most of the times, the reported cases may be underestimated than the actual prevalence. The pathophysiology of the condition is unclear. In women, it usually occurs after puberty, aggravates during pregnancy and subsides after delivery. Some cases have been reported in individuals who underwent estrogen therapy. Although, it is a benign condition, it is associated with cosmetic concerns and may also cause problems during breastfeeding. Hyperkeratosis may last indefinitely, if left untreated. The treatment consists of surgical methods or topical medications.
