= Mepivacaine =

Local anaesthetic

Clinical data
- AHFS/Drugs.com: Consumer Drug Information
- MedlinePlus: a603026
- Pregnancy category: C; use with caution, may cause fetal bradycardia
- ATC code: N01BB03 (WHO)

Identifiers
- IUPAC name: (RS)-N-(2,6-dimethylphenyl)- 1-methyl-piperidine-2-carboxamide
- CAS Number: 96-88-8
- PubChem CID: 4062
- IUPHAR/BPS: 7224
- DrugBank: DB00961
- ChemSpider: 3922
- UNII: B6E06QE59J
- KEGG: D08181
- ChEBI: CHEBI:6759
- ChEMBL: ChEMBL1087
- CompTox Dashboard (EPA): DTXSID9023259
- ECHA InfoCard: 100.002.313

Chemical and physical data
- Formula: C_{15}H_{22}N_{2}O
- Molar mass: 246.354 g·mol^{−1}
- 3D model (JSmol): Interactive image
- SMILES: O=C(Nc1c(cccc1C)C)C2N(C)CCCC2
- InChI: InChI=1S/C15H22N2O/c1-11-7-6-8-12(2)14(11)16-15(18)13-9-4-5-10-17(13)3/h6-8,13H,4-5,9-10H2,1-3H3,(H,16,18); Key:INWLQCZOYSRPNW-UHFFFAOYSA-N

Mepivacaine /mɛˈpɪvəkeɪn/ is a local anesthetic of the amide type. Mepivacaine has a reasonably rapid onset (less rapid than that of procaine) and medium duration of action (longer than that of procaine) and is marketed under various trade names including Carbocaine and Polocaine.

Mepivacaine became available in the United States in the 1960s.

Mepivacaine is used in any infiltration and local anesthesia.

It is supplied as the hydrochloride salt of the racemate, which consists of R(-)-mepivacaine and S(+)-mepivacaine in equal proportions. These two enantiomers have markedly different pharmacokinetic properties.

Mepivacaine was originally synthesized in Sweden at the laboratory of Bofors Nobelkrut by Ekenstam and Pattersson in 1957.
