= Estradiol decanoate =

Chemical compound

Clinical data
- Other names: E2D; Estradiol decylate; Estradiol 17β-decanoate; Estra-1,3,5(10)-triene-3,17β-diol 17β-decanoate
- Routes of administration: By mouth
- Drug class: Estrogen; Estrogen ester

Identifiers
- IUPAC name: [(8R,9S,13S,14S,17S)-3-Hydroxy-13-methyl-6,7,8,9,11,12,14,15,16,17-decahydrocyclopenta[a]phenanthren-17-yl] decanoate
- CAS Number: 61748-93-4
- PubChem CID: 66409
- ChemSpider: 59783
- UNII: S4J8Z2L5LZ
- CompTox Dashboard (EPA): DTXSID90210752

Chemical and physical data
- Formula: C_{28}H_{42}O_{3}
- Molar mass: 426.641 g·mol^{−1}
- 3D model (JSmol): Interactive image
- SMILES: CCCCCCCCCC(=O)O[C@H]1CC[C@@H]2[C@@]1(CC[C@H]3[C@H]2CCC4=C3C=CC(=C4)O)C
- InChI: InChI=1S/C28H42O3/c1-3-4-5-6-7-8-9-10-27(30)31-26-16-15-25-24-13-11-20-19-21(29)12-14-22(20)23(24)17-18-28(25,26)2/h12,14,19,23-26,29H,3-11,13,15-18H2,1-2H3/t23-,24-,25+,26+,28+/m1/s1; Key:YYFQNZXJGOTFRX-VMBLQBCYSA-N

Estradiol decanoate (E2D), or estradiol decylate, also known as estradiol 17β-decanoate, is a synthetic steroidal estrogen and an estrogen ester – specifically, the 17β-decanoate (decylate) ester of estradiol – which was studied for use in hormone replacement therapy for ovariectomized women in the late 1970s but was never marketed.

Oral estradiol decanoate in oil at a dosage of 0.25 to 0.5 mg/day for 14 days has been studied in ovariectomized women and found to produce levels of estrone and estradiol with a ratio of about 1:2 (0.5) to 1:1.7 (0.6). This is in contrast to oral micronized estradiol, which has an estrone to estradiol ratio of about 5:1 (an 8- to 10-fold difference in ratio relative to oral estradiol decanoate in oil). The normal ratio of estrone to estradiol in women is about 1:2 (0.5) in premenopausal women and about 2:1 in postmenopausal women. As such, oral estradiol decanoate in oil may provide a more physiological and favorable profile of estrone and estradiol levels than oral micronized estradiol.

The improved estrone to estradiol ratio of oral estradiol decanoate in oil is likely related to absorption via the intestinal lymphatic system, which allows for bypassing of first-pass metabolism in the liver. This is dependent on the fatty acid decanoate ester of estradiol decanoate, and in accordance, oral estradiol decanoate not dissolved in oil has less or absent effects in rodents. Absorption of oral estradiol decanoate in oil via the lymphatic system is analogous to the case of oral testosterone undecanoate in oil.

== See also ==
- List of estrogen esters § Estradiol esters
