= List of marketed estradiol benzoate formulations =

This is a list of currently marketed formulations of estradiol benzoate (EB) throughout the world. Both EB alone and combinations of EB with other medications are included. The brand name, manufacturers, and countries marketed are listed. Discontinued or no longer marketed formulations of EB are not listed. The formulations listed unless otherwise indicated are generally oil solutions for intramuscular injection.

== Estradiol benzoate alone ==
- Agofollin Depot (BB Pharma; Czech Republic, Slovakia) [microcrystalline aqueous suspension for intramuscular injection]
- Benzo-Ginestryl (Sanofi-Aventis; Mexico)
- Estradiol Benzoate Astar (Astar; Taiwan)
- Estradiol Benzoate Tai Yu (Tai Yu; Taiwan)
- Estradiol Benzoato Pharma Arte (Pharma Arte; Paraguay)
- Estramon (CCPC / Hexal; Lithuania, Taiwan)
- Imegiol (Imeg; Paraguay)
- Oestradiol Benzoate March (March Pharma; Thailand)
- Yi Tai Li (Maidihai; China)

=== Veterinary ===
- Bomerol for Cattle (Bayer Australia Ltd Animal Health; Australia)
- Mesalin (Intervet; Poland)

== Estradiol benzoate plus progestogens ==
=== Estradiol benzoate/progesterone ===
- Ciclotest Forte (Quimica Janvier; Paraguay)
- Ciclovulan Forte (Farmical; Paraguay)
- Cumorit Forte (Taiwan Hemeilong; Taiwan)
- Damax (Offenbach; Mexico)
- Dispert GEN Fuerte (Dispert; Uruguay)
- Duogynon (CCM; Malaysia)
- Duoton (TP; Thailand)
- Duoton Fort T P (Thailand)
- Evacin (FA.PA.SA.; Paraguay)
- Feminal Forte (Sanifar; Paraguay)
- Gestrygen (Bruluart; Mexico)
- Lutes (Mochida Pharmaceutical; Japan)
- Lutofolone (Misr; Egypt)
- Lutoginestryl F (Sanofi-Aventis; Mexico)
- Menovis (Teofarma; Italy)
- Mestrolar (Paill; Belize, El Salvador, Guatemala, Honduras, Nicaragua)
- Metrigen Fuerte (Aspen Labs; Mexico)
- Nomestrol (Vijosa; Belize, El Salvador, Guatemala, Honduras, Nicaragua, Panama)
- Origeron (Kai Yuen; Hong Kong)
- Phenokinon-F (Vesco; Thailand)
- Primoson-F (Quimica Son's; Mexico)
- Pro-Estramon-S (Tai Yu; Taiwan)
- Prodiol (Gentle / Tai Yu; Taiwan)
- Proger-F (Streger; Mexico)
- Progestediol (Tai Yu; Taiwan)
- Progestradiol Forte (Lasca; Paraguay)
- Sinergon (Millet; Paraguay)
- Sinergon Forte (Millet Paraguay)
- Unitest Forte (Galeno; Paraguay)
- Vermagest (Vijosa; El Salvador, Honduras, Nicaragua)

==== Veterinary ====
- Component E-C (Elanco; South Africa) [implant]
- Component E-S (Elanco, South Africa) [implant]
- Synovex C (Zoetis; Canada, South Africa, United States) [implant]
- Synovex S (Zoetis; Australia, Canada, South Africa, United States) [implant]

=== Estradiol benzoate/progesterone/lidocaine ===
- Clinomin Forte (Medical Farmac; Paraguay) [microcrystalline aqueous suspension for intramuscular injection]

=== Estradiol benzoate/progesterone/tylosin ===
==== Veterinary ====
- Component E-C with Tylan (Elanco Animal Health; United States) [implant]
- Component E-S with Tylan (Elanco Animal Health; United States) [implant]

=== Estradiol benzoate/hydroxyprogesterone caproate ===
- Dos Dias N (Elea; Argentina)
- Primosiston (Bayer / BSP Bayer Schering Pharma; Argentina, Ecuador, Paraguay)

== Estradiol benzoate plus androgens/anabolic steroids ==
=== Estradiol benzoate/testosterone propionate ===
- Bothermon (ASKA Seiyaku Asuka; Japan)

==== Veterinary ====
- Component E-H (Elanco; South Africa) [implant]
- Synovex H (Zoetis; Australia, Canada, South Africa, United States) [implant]

=== Estradiol benzoate/testosterone propionate/tylosin ===
==== Veterinary ====
- Component E-H (Elanco Animal Health; United States) [implant]

=== Estradiol benzoate/testosterone isobutyrate ===
- Folivirin (BB Pharma; Czech Republic) [microcrystalline aqueous suspension for intramuscular injection]

=== Estradiol benzoate/trenbolone acetate ===
==== Veterinary ====
- Synovex Choice (Zoetis; Canada, United States) [implant]
- Synovex One (Zoetis; United States) [implant]
- Synovex Plus (Zoetis; Canada, South Africa, United States) [implant]
- Synovex with Trenbolone Acetate (Zoetis; Australia) [implant]

== Estradiol benzoate plus estrogens and androgens/anabolic steroids ==
=== Estradiol benzoate/estradiol phenylpropionate/testosterone propionate/testosterone phenylpropionate/testosterone isocaproate ===
- Estandron P (Organon; Brazil)
- Mixogen (Organon; India)

== Estradiol benzoate plus miscellaneous agents ==
=== Estradiol benzoate/prednisolone/salicylic acid ===
- Alpicort E (Dr. August Wolff; Poland) [solution applied to the scalp]
- Alpicort F (Alcina / Dr. August Wolff / Remedia; Bulgaria, Croatia (Hrvatska), Czech Republic, Germany, Slovakia, Switzerland) [solution applied to the scalp]
- Alpicort Plus (Dr. August Wolff; Hungary) [solution applied to the scalp]

=== Estradiol benzoate/gentamicin/hydrocortisone/nystatin ===
- Cridermol Fem (EMPA; Paraguay) [vaginal cream]
- Ginabiot (Tecnofarma; Paraguay) [vaginal cream]
- Ginecovan (Farmical; Paraguay) [vaginal cream]

== Discontinued estradiol benzoate formulations ==
- Estradiol benzoate/estradiol phenylpropionate (Dimenformon Prolongatum)
- Estradiol benzoate/estradiol dienanthate/testosterone enanthate benzilic acid hydrazone (Climacteron, Lactimex, Lactostat)
- Estradiol benzoate/estradiol valerate/hydroxyprogesterone caproate (Sin-Ol)
- Estradiol benzoate/monalazone (Malun 25) [vaginal tablet]
- Estradiol benzoate/progesterone (Sistocyclin) [microcrystalline aqueous suspension for intramuscular injection]
- Estradiol benzoate/progesterone/methandriol dipropionate (Progestandron)
- Estradiol benzoate/progesterone/testosterone propionate (Lukestra, Steratrin, Trihormonal, Trinestryl)

=== Veterinary ===
- Estradiol benzoate/estradiol enanthate/testosterone enanthate (Uni-Bol)

== See also ==
- Estradiol benzoate § Available forms
- Estradiol benzoate § Availability
- List of combined sex-hormonal preparations
