= Estrone/progesterone =

Combination drug

- Estrone (top) and progesterone (bottom)

Combination of
- Estrone: Estrogen
- Progesterone: Progestogen

Clinical data
- Trade names: Synergon
- Other names: E1/P4
- Routes of administration: Intramuscular injection

Estrone/progesterone (E1/P4), sold under the brand name Synergon, is a combination medication formulation of estrone, an estrogen, and progesterone, a progestogen. E1/P4 is used as an injectable preparation to induce withdrawal bleeding in women with non-pregnancy-related amenorrhea (absence of menstruation). It has also sometimes been used off-label as an abortifacient. The medication comes in a three-ampoule pack, contains 1 mg estrone and 10 mg progesterone per ampoule, and is administered by intramuscular injection. The usual dose of the medication is three injections, each two days apart, with the treatment duration not exceeding one week. E1/P4 is or has been available in France, Monaco, and Turkey, as well as in some French-speaking African countries such as Benin and Cameroon. The medication has been marketed since at least 1952.

== See also ==
- Estradiol/progesterone
- Estradiol benzoate/progesterone
- Estradiol hemisuccinate/progesterone
- List of combined sex-hormonal preparations
