= Estradiol hemisuccinate/progesterone =

Combination drug

Estradiol hemisuccinate / progesterone

- Estradiol hemisuccinate (top) and progesterone (bottom)

Combination of
- Estradiol hemisuccinate: Estrogen
- Progesterone: Progestogen

Clinical data
- Trade names: Hosterona
- Other names: EHS/P4
- Routes of administration: Intramuscular injection

Estradiol hemisuccinate/progesterone (EHS/P4), sold under the brand name Hosterona, is an injectable combination medication of estradiol hemisuccinate (EHS), an estrogen, and progesterone (P4), a progestogen, which is used to induce withdrawal bleeding in women with non-pregnancy-related amenorrhea (absence of menstruation). It is provided in the form of ampoules containing 20 mg/2 mL EHS and 100 mg/2 mL P4 and is administered by intramuscular injection. The medication is available in Argentina and Paraguay.

== See also ==
- Estradiol/progesterone
- Estradiol benzoate/progesterone
- Estrone/progesterone
- List of combined sex-hormonal preparations
