= A.T. Mine E.P. Mark V =

A.T mine E.P Mark V
- Type: Anti-tank mine
- Place of origin: United Kingdom

Service history
- Used by: United Kingdom
- Wars: World War II

Specifications
- Mass: 12.5 lb (5.7 kg)
- Height: 4 in (100 mm)
- Diameter: 8 in (200 mm)
- Filling: TNT or Baratol
- Filling weight: 8.25 lb (3.74 kg)

The A.T. Mine E.P. Mark V is a World War II British anti-tank mine, an improved version of previous A.T. Mine E.P.-type mines such as the A.T. Mine E.P. Mark II.

== Design ==
The mine is four inches (100 mm) in height and seven inches (180 mm) in diameter. The mine cover, shaped like a mushroom, is attached to the mine with three pins that fit into retaining straps. Similar to the A.T. Mine E.P. Mark II, when pressure is placed on the mine a plunger is sent straight down through a shear wire and crushes an ampule cartridge. This causes a chemical reaction which activates the detonator. The mine differs from previous models in that, instead of the detonator activating the mine itself, it triggers a booster charge which then triggers the mine. To arm the mine, one must take off the cover and then place the fuse in it. One then puts an ampule into the detonator and seals it, then inserts the detonator into the fuse, then seals the detonator grease fuse, and then inserts the mine's central fuse well, then puts the cover back in, and it is armed. To disable the mine, take off the cover with no downward pressure and then take out the fuse.
