= Estradiol benzoate/trenbolone acetate =

Combination drug

Estradiol benzoate / trenbolone acetate

- Estradiol benzoate (top) and trenbolone acetate (bottom)

Combination of
- Estradiol benzoate: Estrogen
- Trenbolone acetate: Androgen; Anabolic steroid

Clinical data
- Trade names: Synovex Choice, Synovex One, Synovex Plus
- Routes of administration: Subcutaneous implant (pellet)

Legal status
- Legal status: CA: ℞-only

Identifiers
- CAS Number: 8060-43-3

Estradiol benzoate/trenbolone acetate, sold under the brand names Synovex Choice, Synovex One, Synovex Plus, Synovex with Trenbolone Acetate, is an implantable combination medication of estradiol benzoate (EB), an estrogen, and trenbolone acetate, an androgen/anabolic steroid, which is used in veterinary medicine as a growth promoter for livestock. It is provided in the form of pellets of pure crystalline estradiol benzoate and trenbolone acetate and is administered by subcutaneous implantation at regular intervals.

== See also ==
- Estradiol benzoate/progesterone
- Estradiol benzoate/testosterone propionate
- List of combined sex-hormonal preparations § Estrogens, progestogens, and androgens
