= List of sex-hormonal aqueous suspensions =

This is a list of known sex-hormonal crystalline aqueous suspension formulations. Brand names and developmental code names are in parentheses.

== Single-drug formulations ==
=== Androgens ===
- Androstanolone
- Methandriol (Notandron, Protandren)
- Testosterone (Andronaq, Sterotate, Virosterone)
- Testosterone buciclate (20 Aet-1, CDB-1781; never marketed)
- Testosterone isobutyrate (Agovirin Depot, Perandren M, Testocryst, Virex-Cryst)
- Testosterone ketolaurate (Testosid)
- Testosterone nicotinate (Bolfortan, Linobol)
- Testosterone phenylacetate (Perandren, Androject)
- Testosterone propionate (Anertan, Perandren)

=== Estrogens ===
- Dienestrol diacetate (Farmacyrol KS)
- Diethylstilbestrol dipropionate (Cyren B)
- Estradiol (Aquadiol, Diogyn, Progynon Aqueous Suspension, Progynon Micropellets)
- Estradiol benzoate (Agofollin Depot, Ovocyclin M)
- Estrone (Estrone Aqueous Suspension, Kestrone, Theelin Aqueous)

=== Progestogens ===
- Medroxyprogesterone acetate (Depo-Provera)
- Progesterone (Agolutin Depot, Flavolutan, Luteosan, Lutocyclin M, Lutren)

=== Others ===
- Pregnenolone acetate (Enelone, Natolone, others)

== Multi-drug formulations ==
=== Estrogens and progestogens ===
- Estradiol/megestrol acetate (Mego-E, Chinese injectable No. 2)
- Estradiol benzoate/progesterone (Sistocyclin)
- Estradiol benzoate/progesterone/lidocaine (Clinomin Forte)
- Estradiol cypionate/medroxyprogesterone acetate (Cyclofem, Lunelle)

=== Estrogens and androgens ===
- Estradiol benzoate/testosterone isobutyrate (Femandren M, Folivirin)

=== Estrogens, progestogens, and androgens ===
- Estrone/progesterone/testosterone (Tristeron, Tristerone)

== Non-sex-hormonal aqueous suspensions ==
=== Corticosteroids ===
- Betamethasone acetate (Celestone Soluspan)
- Desoxycorticosterone pivalate (Percorten Pivalate)
- Methylprednisolone acetate (Depo-Medrol, Depo-Medrone)
- Triamcinolone acetonide (Kenacort Retard, Kenalog Retard)
- Triamcinolone diacetate (Ledercort-Retard)
- Triamcinolone hexacetonide (Aristospan)

=== Antipsychotics ===
- Aripiprazole lauroxil (Aristada)
- Aripiprazole monohydrate (Abilify Maintena)
- Fluspirilene (Redeptin)
- Paliperidone palmitate (Invega Sustenna)

== See also ==
- List of combined sex-hormonal preparations
- List of androgen esters
- List of estrogen esters
- List of progestogen esters
