= Estradiol benzoate/estradiol valerate/norethisterone acetate/testosterone enanthate =

Combination drug

EB/EV/NETA/TE
Combination of
- Estradiol benzoate: Estrogen
- Estradiol valerate: Estrogen
- Norethisterone acetate: Progestin
- Testosterone enanthate: Androgen; Anabolic steroid

Clinical data
- Trade names: Ablacton
- Other names: EB/EV/NETA/TE
- Routes of administration: Intramuscular injection

Identifiers
- CAS Number: 64115-79-3
- PubChem CID: 191721
- ChemSpider: 166460

Estradiol benzoate/estradiol valerate/norethisterone acetate/testosterone enanthate (EB/EV/NETA/TE), sold under the brand name Ablacton, is an injectable combination medication of estradiol benzoate (EB), an estrogen, estradiol valerate (EV), an estrogen, norethisterone acetate (NETA), a progestin, and testosterone enanthate (TE), an androgen/anabolic steroid, which has been used to suppress lactation in women. It contains 5 mg EB, 8 mg EV, 20 mg NETA, and 180 mg TE in oil solution and is provided in the form of ampoules. It is given as a single intramuscular injection following childbirth. The medication was manufactured by Schering and was previously marketed in Italy and Spain, but is no longer available.

== See also ==
- List of combined sex-hormonal preparations § Estrogens, progestogens, and androgens
