= Estradiol benzoate/progesterone/testosterone propionate =

Combination drug

EB/P4/TP
Combination of
- Estradiol benzoate: Estrogen
- Progesterone: Progestogen
- Testosterone propionate: Androgen; Anabolic steroid

Clinical data
- Trade names: Lukestra, Steratrin, Trihormonal, Trinestryl
- Other names: EB/P4/TP
- Routes of administration: Intramuscular injection

Estradiol benzoate/progesterone/testosterone propionate (EB/P4/TP), sold under the brand names Lukestra, Steratrin, Trihormonal, and Trinestryl, is an injectable combination medication of estradiol benzoate (EB), an estrogen, progesterone (P4), a progestogen, and testosterone propionate (TP), an androgen/anabolic steroid. It contained 1 to 3 mg EB, 20 to 25 mg P4, and 25 mg TP, was provided in the form of ampoules, and was administered by intramuscular injection. The medication was introduced by 1949 and was marketed in the United States, the United Kingdom, and Germany among other places. It is no longer available.

== See also ==
- List of combined sex-hormonal preparations § Estrogens, progestogens, and androgens
