= Estradiol pivalate/progesterone =

Combination drug

- Estradiol pivalate (top) and progesterone (bottom)

Combination of
- Estradiol pivalate: Estrogen
- Progesterone: Progestogen

Clinical data
- Trade names: Estrotate with Progesterone
- Other names: ETMA/P4; EP/P4
- Routes of administration: Intramuscular injection

Estradiol pivalate/progesterone (ETMA/P4), sold under the brand name Estrotate with Progesterone, is a combination medication of estradiol pivalate (estradiol trimethylacetate; ETMA), an estrogen, and progesterone (P4), a progestogen, which was used in menopausal hormone therapy and the treatment of gynecological disorders but is no longer available. It contained 1 mg/mL ETMA and 10 mg/mL P4 in oil solution provided in vials and was administered by intramuscular injection at regular intervals.

ETMA/P4 was introduced for medical use by 1949. It was one of the first combined estrogen and progestogen medications to be marketed, and was followed by the more well-known estradiol benzoate/progesterone (brand name Duogynon) in 1950. Other similar estrogen–progestogen preparations were also subsequently introduced.

== See also ==
- Estradiol benzoate/progesterone
- List of combined sex-hormonal preparations
