= Estradiol benzoate/progesterone/methandriol dipropionate =

Combination drug

EB/P4/MADP
Combination of
- Estradiol benzoate: Estrogen
- Progesterone: Progestogen
- Methandriol dipropionate: Androgen; Anabolic steroid

Clinical data
- Trade names: Progestandron
- Other names: EB/P4/MADP
- Routes of administration: Intramuscular injection

Estradiol benzoate/progesterone/methandriol dipropionate (EB/P4/MADP), sold under the brand name Progestandron (Organon), is an injectable combination medication of estradiol benzoate (EB), an estrogen, progesterone (P4), a progestogen, and methandriol dipropionate (MADP), an androgen/anabolic steroid. It contained 3 mg EB, 20 mg P4, and 50 mg MADP, was provided in the form of ampoules, and was administered by intramuscular injection. The medication was marketed by 1957. It is no longer available.

== See also ==
- List of combined sex-hormonal preparations § Estrogens, progestogens, and androgens
