= Estradiol cypionate/testosterone enanthate =

Combination drug

Estradiol cypionate / testosterone enanthate

- Estradiol cypionate (top) and testosterone enanthate (bottom)

Combination of
- Estradiol cypionate: Estrogen
- Testosterone enanthate: Androgen; Anabolic steroid

Clinical data
- Trade names: Supligol
- Other names: EC/TE
- Routes of administration: Intramuscular injection

Identifiers
- CAS Number: 8058-22-8

Estradiol cypionate/testosterone enanthate (EC/TE), sold under the brand name Supligol, is an injectable combination medication of estradiol cypionate (EC), an estrogen, and testosterone enanthate (TE), an androgen/anabolic steroid, which is used in menopausal hormone therapy for women, to treat prostatic hypertrophy in men, to treat osteoporosis, and to suppress lactation in women, among other uses. It contains 4 mg EC and 80 mg TE (57.5 mg free testosterone) in oil solution in each ampoule and is administered by intramuscular injection once every 3 to 6 weeks for hormone therapy in women. The medication was marketed by 1976 and remains available today in Paraguay.

Androgen replacement therapy formulations and dosages used in women
Route	Medication	Major brand names	Form	Dosage
Oral	Testosterone undecanoate	Andriol, Jatenzo	Capsule	40–80 mg 1x/1–2 days
Oral	Methyltestosterone	Metandren, Estratest	Tablet	0.5–10 mg/day
Oral	Fluoxymesterone	Halotestin	Tablet	1–2.5 mg 1x/1–2 days
Oral	Normethandrone^{a}	Ginecoside	Tablet	5 mg/day
Oral	Tibolone	Livial	Tablet	1.25–2.5 mg/day
Oral	Prasterone (DHEA)^{b}	–	Tablet	10–100 mg/day
Sublingual	Methyltestosterone	Metandren	Tablet	0.25 mg/day
Transdermal	Testosterone	Intrinsa	Patch	150–300 μg/day
Transdermal	Testosterone	AndroGel	Gel, cream	1–10 mg/day
Vaginal	Prasterone (DHEA)	Intrarosa	Insert	6.5 mg/day
Injection	Testosterone propionate^{a}	Testoviron	Oil solution	25 mg 1x/1–2 weeks
Injection	Testosterone enanthate	Delatestryl, Primodian Depot	Oil solution	25–100 mg 1x/4–6 weeks
Injection	Testosterone cypionate	Depo-Testosterone, Depo-Testadiol	Oil solution	25–100 mg 1x/4–6 weeks
Injection	Testosterone isobutyrate^{a}	Femandren M, Folivirin	Aqueous suspension	25–50 mg 1x/4–6 weeks
Injection	Mixed testosterone esters	Climacteron^{a}	Oil solution	150 mg 1x/4–8 weeks
Injection	Mixed testosterone esters	Omnadren, Sustanon	Oil solution	50–100 mg 1x/4–6 weeks
Injection	Nandrolone decanoate	Deca-Durabolin	Oil solution	25–50 mg 1x/6–12 weeks
Injection	Prasterone enanthate^{a}	Gynodian Depot	Oil solution	200 mg 1x/4–6 weeks
Implant	Testosterone	Testopel	Pellet	50–100 mg 1x/3–6 months
Notes: Premenopausal women produce about 230 ± 70 μg testosterone per day (6.4 ± 2.0 mg testosterone per 4 weeks), with a range of 130 to 330 μg per day (3.6–9.2 mg per 4 weeks). Footnotes: ^{a} = Mostly discontinued or unavailable. ^{b} = Over-the-counter. Sources: See template.

== See also ==
- List of combined sex-hormonal preparations
