= Testosterone propionate/testosterone cypionate/prasterone =

Combination drug

TP/TC/DHEA
Combination of
- Testosterone propionate: Androgen; Anabolic steroid
- Testosterone cypionate: Androgen; Anabolic steroid
- Prasterone: Androgen; Neurosteroid

Clinical data
- Trade names: Sten
- Other names: TP/TC/DHEA
- Routes of administration: Intramuscular injection

Identifiers
- CAS Number: 84872-30-0

Testosterone propionate/testosterone cypionate/prasterone (TP/TC/DHEA), sold under the brand name Sten, is an injectable combination medication of testosterone propionate (TP), a fast-acting androgen/anabolic steroid, testosterone cypionate (TC), a long-acting androgen/anabolic steroid, and prasterone (dehydroepiandrosterone; DHEA), an androgen and neurosteroid, which has been used to treat andropause, hypogonadism, and impotence in men and breast cancer, fibrocystic breast disease, and low sexual desire in women. It contains 25 mg TP, 75 mg TC, and 20 mg DHEA in 2 mL oil solution provided in ampoules and is administered by intramuscular injection once every 15 to 30 days. The medication was previously marketed in Mexico but appears to no longer available. The duration of action of TP/TC/DHEA has been reported to be approximately 15 to 30 days, due to the long-acting TC component.

Parenteral durations of androgens/anabolic steroids
Medication	Form	Major brand names	Duration
Testosterone	Aqueous suspension	Andronaq, Sterotate, Virosterone	2–3 days
Testosterone propionate	Oil solution	Androteston, Perandren, Testoviron	3–4 days
Testosterone phenylpropionate	Oil solution	Testolent	8 days
Testosterone isobutyrate	Aqueous suspension	Agovirin Depot, Perandren M	14 days
Mixed testosterone esters^{a}	Oil solution	Triolandren	10–20 days
Mixed testosterone esters^{b}	Oil solution	Testosid Depot	14–20 days
Testosterone enanthate	Oil solution	Delatestryl	14–28 days
Testosterone cypionate	Oil solution	Depovirin	14–28 days
Mixed testosterone esters^{c}	Oil solution	Sustanon 250	28 days
Testosterone undecanoate	Oil solution	Aveed, Nebido	100 days
Testosterone buciclate^{d}	Aqueous suspension	20 Aet-1, CDB-1781^{e}	90–120 days
Nandrolone phenylpropionate	Oil solution	Durabolin	10 days
Nandrolone decanoate	Oil solution	Deca Durabolin	21–28 days
Methandriol	Aqueous suspension	Notandron, Protandren	8 days
Methandriol bisenanthoyl acetate	Oil solution	Notandron Depot	16 days
Metenolone acetate	Oil solution	Primobolan	3 days
Metenolone enanthate	Oil solution	Primobolan Depot	14 days
Note: All are via i.m. injection. Footnotes: ^{a} = TP, TV, and TUe. ^{b} = TP and TKL. ^{c} = TP, TPP, TiCa, and TD. ^{d} = Studied but never marketed. ^{e} = Developmental code names. Sources: See template.

== See also ==
- List of combined sex-hormonal preparations § Androgens
