= Estradiol benzoate/testosterone isobutyrate =

Combination drug

Estradiol benzoate / testosterone isobutyrate

- Estradiol benzoate (top) and testosterone isobutyrate (bottom)

Combination of
- Estradiol benzoate: Estrogen
- Testosterone isobutyrate: Androgen; Anabolic steroid

Clinical data
- Trade names: Femandren M, Folivirin
- Other names: EB/TiB; EB/TiB
- Routes of administration: Intramuscular injection

Identifiers
- CAS Number: 72708-14-6

Estradiol benzoate/testosterone isobutyrate (EB/TiB), sold under the brand names Femandren M and Folivirin, is an injectable combination medication of estradiol benzoate (EB), an estrogen, and testosterone isobutyrate (TiB), an androgen/anabolic steroid, which is used in menopausal hormone therapy for women. It is provided in the form of 1 mL ampoules containing 2.5 mg estradiol benzoate and 25 mg testosterone isobutyrate in a microcrystalline aqueous suspension and is administered by intramuscular injection once every 4 to 6 weeks. EB/TiB reportedly has a duration of about 14 to 21 days.

The medication is available only in the Czech Republic and Slovakia. EB/TiB was originally developed and marketed by the Swiss pharmaceutical company Ciba and was introduced for medical use by 1953, following the development of testosterone isobutyrate in 1952. It was intermittently manufactured by Spofa and then Biotika and is now manufactured by BB Pharma.

The effect of EB/TiB on gonadotropin levels in postmenopausal women have been studied.

An oral tablet product with the same brand name of Femandren, containing ethinylestradiol and methyltestosterone, was marketed around the same time as Femandren M, and should not be confused with the injectable formulation.

Androgen replacement therapy formulations and dosages used in women
Route	Medication	Major brand names	Form	Dosage
Oral	Testosterone undecanoate	Andriol, Jatenzo	Capsule	40–80 mg 1x/1–2 days
Oral	Methyltestosterone	Metandren, Estratest	Tablet	0.5–10 mg/day
Oral	Fluoxymesterone	Halotestin	Tablet	1–2.5 mg 1x/1–2 days
Oral	Normethandrone^{a}	Ginecoside	Tablet	5 mg/day
Oral	Tibolone	Livial	Tablet	1.25–2.5 mg/day
Oral	Prasterone (DHEA)^{b}	–	Tablet	10–100 mg/day
Sublingual	Methyltestosterone	Metandren	Tablet	0.25 mg/day
Transdermal	Testosterone	Intrinsa	Patch	150–300 μg/day
Transdermal	Testosterone	AndroGel	Gel, cream	1–10 mg/day
Vaginal	Prasterone (DHEA)	Intrarosa	Insert	6.5 mg/day
Injection	Testosterone propionate^{a}	Testoviron	Oil solution	25 mg 1x/1–2 weeks
Injection	Testosterone enanthate	Delatestryl, Primodian Depot	Oil solution	25–100 mg 1x/4–6 weeks
Injection	Testosterone cypionate	Depo-Testosterone, Depo-Testadiol	Oil solution	25–100 mg 1x/4–6 weeks
Injection	Testosterone isobutyrate^{a}	Femandren M, Folivirin	Aqueous suspension	25–50 mg 1x/4–6 weeks
Injection	Mixed testosterone esters	Climacteron^{a}	Oil solution	150 mg 1x/4–8 weeks
Injection	Mixed testosterone esters	Omnadren, Sustanon	Oil solution	50–100 mg 1x/4–6 weeks
Injection	Nandrolone decanoate	Deca-Durabolin	Oil solution	25–50 mg 1x/6–12 weeks
Injection	Prasterone enanthate^{a}	Gynodian Depot	Oil solution	200 mg 1x/4–6 weeks
Implant	Testosterone	Testopel	Pellet	50–100 mg 1x/3–6 months
Notes: Premenopausal women produce about 230 ± 70 μg testosterone per day (6.4 ± 2.0 mg testosterone per 4 weeks), with a range of 130 to 330 μg per day (3.6–9.2 mg per 4 weeks). Footnotes: ^{a} = Mostly discontinued or unavailable. ^{b} = Over-the-counter. Sources: See template.

== See also ==
- Estradiol benzoate/progesterone
- List of combined sex-hormonal preparations
- List of sex-hormonal aqueous suspensions
