= List of combined sex-hormonal preparations =

This is a list of known combined sex-hormonal formulations. Brand names and developmental code names are in parentheses.

== Androgens ==
=== Injection ===
==== Marketed ====
- Nandrolone decanoate/nandrolone phenylpropionate (Dinandrol)
- Testosterone propionate/testosterone isocaproate/testosterone caproate (Androteston PP)
- Testosterone propionate/testosterone enanthate/testosterone undecylenate (Durasteron)
- Testosterone propionate/testosterone enanthate (Testoviron Depot)
- Testosterone propionate/testosterone ketolaurate (Testosid Depot)
- Testosterone propionate/testosterone phenylpropionate/testosterone isocaproate (Sustanon 100)
- Testosterone propionate/testosterone phenylpropionate/testosterone isocaproate/testosterone caproate (Omnadren 250)
- Testosterone propionate/testosterone phenylpropionate/testosterone isocaproate/testosterone decanoate (Sustanon 250)
- Testosterone propionate/testosterone valerate/testosterone undecylenate (Triolandren)
- Testosterone propionate/testosterone cypionate/prasterone (Sten)

=== Veterinary ===
==== Marketed ====
- Boldenone acetate/boldenone cypionate/boldenone propionate/boldenone undecylenate (Equilon 100)
- Testosterone acetate/testosterone undecanoate/testosterone valerate (Deposterona)

== Estrogens ==
=== Oral ===
==== Marketed ====
- Conjugated estriol (Emmenin, Progynon)
- Conjugated estrogens (Premarin)
- Esterified estrogens (Estratab, Menest)
- Estradiol/estrone/estriol (Hormonin)
- Ethinylestradiol/dienestrol (Foxinette)

=== Injection ===
==== Marketed ====
- Estradiol benzoate/estradiol phenylpropionate (Dimenformon Prolongatum)

==== Never marketed ====
- Estradiol/estradiol enanthate

== Progestogens ==
=== Injection ===
==== Marketed ====
- Progesterone/hydroxyprogesterone heptanoate/α-tocopherol palmitate (Tocogestan)

== Androgens and estrogens ==
=== Oral ===
==== Marketed ====
- Chlorotrianisene/methyltestosterone (Tace mit Androgen)
- Conjugated estrogens/methyltestosterone (Premarin with Methyltestosterone)
- Dienestrol/methyltestosterone (Estan, Lucidon)
- Dienestrol diacetate/methyltestosterone (Farmatest)
- Diethylstilbestrol/methyltestosterone (Tylosterone)
- Esterified estrogens/methyltestosterone (Covaryx, Eemt, Essian, Estratest, Menogen, Syntest)
- Ethinylestradiol/methyltestosterone (Climatone, Dumone, Duotrone, Estandron, Femandren, Femovirin, Gynetone, Lynandron, Mepilin, Mixogen, Primodian)
- Methylestradiol/methyltestosterone (Klimanosid)
- Methylestradiol/methyltestosterone/reserpine (Klimanosid R)

=== Injection ===
==== Marketed ====
- Estradiol benzoate/testosterone propionate (Bothermon)
- Estradiol benzoate/estradiol dienanthate/testosterone enanthate benzilic acid hydrazone (Climacteron, Lactimex, Lactostat)
- Estradiol benzoate/estradiol phenylpropionate/testosterone propionate/testosterone phenylpropionate/testosterone isocaproate (Estandron Prolongatum, Lynandron Prolongatum, Mixogen [Injection])
- Estradiol benzoate/testosterone isobutyrate (Femandren M, Folivirin)
- Estradiol butyrylacetate/testosterone ketolaurate/reserpine (Klimanosid R-Depot)
- Estradiol cypionate/testosterone cypionate (Depo-Testadiol, Femovirin)
- Estradiol cypionate/testosterone enanthate (Supligol)
- Estradiol valerate/prasterone enanthate (Binodian Depot, Cidodian Depot, Gynodian Depot, Klimax, Supligol NF)
- Estradiol valerate/testosterone enanthate (Deladumone, Despamen, Ditate, Ditate-DS, Gravignost, Primodian Depot, Valertest)

=== Veterinary ===
==== Marketed ====
- Diethylstilbestrol/methyltestosterone (Maxymin, Tylosterone)
- Diethylstilbestrol/testosterone (Rapigain)
- Estradiol benzoate/estradiol enanthate/testosterone enanthate (Uni-Bol)
- Estradiol benzoate/testosterone propionate (Component E-H, Implix BF, Progro H, Synovex H)
- Ethinylestradiol/methyltestosterone (Taril)

== Estrogens and progestogens ==
=== Oral ===
==== Marketed ====
In birth control pills:

- Drospirenone/estetrol (Nextstellis, Drovelis, Lydisilka)
- Estradiol/nomegestrol acetate (Naemis, Zoely)
- Estradiol valerate/cyproterone acetate (Femilar)
- Estradiol valerate/dienogest (Natazia, Qlaira)
- Ethinylestradiol/chlormadinone acetate (Belara)
- Ethinylestradiol/cyproterone acetate (Diane, Diane-35)
- Ethinylestradiol/desogestrel (Alenvona, Apri, Azurette, Bekyree, Bimizza, Caziant, Cesia, Cimizt, Cyclessa, Cyred, Denise, Desogen, Desirett, Emoquette, Enskyce, Gedarel, Gracial, Isibloom, Juleber, Kalliga, Kariva, Kimidess, Laurina, Linessa, Marvelon, Mercilon, Mircette, Mirvala, Novynette, Ortho-Cept, Pimtrea, Reclipsen, Regulon, Simliya, Solia, Velivet, Viorele, Volnea)
- Ethinylestradiol/dienogest (Valette)
- Ethinylestradiol/dimethisterone (Oracon)
- Ethinylestradiol/drospirenone (Yasmin, Yasminelle, Yaz)
- Ethinylestradiol/drospirenone/levomefolic acid (Beyaz, Safyral)
- Ethinylestradiol/etynodiol diacetate (Demulen)
- Ethinylestradiol/gestodene (Femodene, Femodette, Gynera, Harmonet, Meliane, Minesse, Minulet)
- Ethinylestradiol/levonorgestrel (Amethyst, Aviane, Balcoltra, Falmina, Levlen, Lillow, Orsythia, Vienva)
- Ethinylestradiol/levonorgestrel/bisglycinate
- Ethinylestradiol/levonorgestrel/ferrous fumarate
- Ethinylestradiol/lynestrenol (Lyndiol)
- Ethinylestradiol/medroxyprogesterone acetate (Gianda, Provest)
- Ethinylestradiol/megestrol acetate (Nuvacon, Volidan)
- Ethinylestradiol/norethisterone (Brevicon, Norinyl 1+35, Ortho-Novum 7/7/7, Taytulla, Tri-Norinyl, Zenchent)
- Ethinylestradiol/norethisterone/ferrous fumarate (Blisovi 24 FE, Estrostep Fe, Femcon FE, Kaitlib FE, Lo Minastrin Fe, Loestrin 24 Fe, Microgestin 24 FE)
- Ethinylestradiol/norethisterone acetate (FemHRT)
- Ethinylestradiol/norethisterone acetate/ferrous fumarate
- Ethinylestradiol/norgestimate (Ortho Tri-Cyclen, Sprintec)
- Ethinylestradiol/norgestrel (Ovral)
- Ethinylestradiol/norgestrienone (Miniplanor, Planor)
- Ethinylestradiol/quingestanol acetate (Riglovis)
- Ethinylestradiol sulfonate/norethisterone acetate (Deposiston)
- Mestranol/anagestone acetate (Neo-Novum)
- Mestranol/chlormadinone acetate (C-Quens, Lutedion)
- Mestranol/etynodiol diacetate (Ovulen)
- Mestranol/hydroxyprogesterone acetate (Hormolidin)
- Mestranol/lynestrenol (Lyndiol)
- Mestranol/norethisterone (Norethin, Noriday, Norinyl, Norquen, Ortho-Novum)
- Mestranol/noretynodrel (Enavid, Enovid)
- Quinestrol/etynodiol diacetate (Soluna)
- Quinestrol/levonorgestrel (Yuèkětíng, Àiyuè)
- Quinestrol/norgestrel (Compound Norgestrel)
- Quinestrol/quingestanol acetate (Unovis)

For menopausal hormone therapy and/or gynecological disorders:

- Conjugated estrogens/medrogestone (Presomen)
- Conjugated estrogens/medroxyprogesterone acetate (Prempro, Premphase)
- Conjugated estrogens/norgestrel (Prempak-C)
- Estradiol/drospirenone (Angeliq)
- Estradiol/dydrogesterone (Femoston)
- Estradiol/gestodene (Avaden, Avadene)
- Estradiol/levonorgestrel
- Estradiol/medroxyprogesterone acetate (Indivina, Tridestra)
- Estradiol/norethisterone acetate (Activella, Activelle, Cliane, Estalis, Eviana, Evorel, Kliogest, Novofem)
- Estradiol/norgestimate (Prefest)
- Estradiol/progesterone (Bijuva)
- Estradiol/trimegestone (Lovelle, Totelle)
- Estradiol valerate/cyproterone acetate (Climen, Climen 28)
- Estradiol valerate/estriol/levonorgestrel (CycloÖstrogynal)
- Estradiol valerate/levonorgestrel (Cyclo-Progynova N)
- Estradiol valerate/medroxyprogesterone acetate (Dilena, Divina, Divitren, Farludiol, Indivina, Sisare)
- Estradiol valerate/norethisterone (Climagest, Climesse)
- Estradiol valerate/norethisterone acetate (Cliovelle, Norestin, Trisequens)
- Estradiol valerate/norgestrel (Cyclacur, Cyclocur, Cyclo-Progynova, Postoval, Progyluton)
- Ethinylestradiol/ethisterone (Amenorone, Di-Pro, Duosterone, Menstrogen, Oracecron, Orasecron)
- Mestranol/noretynodrel (Enovid)

==== Never or not yet marketed ====
In birth control pills:

- Estradiol/norethisterone (Netagen, Netagen 403)

=== Transdermal ===
==== Marketed ====
In contraceptive patches:

- Ethinylestradiol/norelgestromin (Evra, Ortho Evra, Xulane)

For menopausal hormone therapy:

- Estradiol/levonorgestrel (Climara Pro)
- Estradiol/norethisterone acetate (CombiPatch)

=== Vaginal ===
==== Marketed ====
In contraceptive vaginal rings:

- Ethinylestradiol/etonogestrel (Circlet, NuvaRing)
- Segesterone acetate/ethinylestradiol (Annovera)

=== Injection ===
==== Marketed ====
In combined injectable contraceptives:

- Estradiol/megestrol acetate (Mego-E, Chinese Injectable No. 2)
- Estradiol benzoate/estradiol valerate/hydroxyprogesterone caproate (Sin-Ol)
- Estradiol benzoate butyrate/algestone acetophenide (Redimen, Soluna, Unijab)
- Estradiol cypionate/hydroxyprogesterone caproate (Sinbios)
- Estradiol cypionate/medroxyprogesterone acetate (Cyclo-Provera, Cyclofem, Lunelle)
- Estradiol enanthate/algestone acetophenide (Anafertin, Deladroxate, Perlutan, Topasel, Yectames)
- Estradiol valerate/hydroxyprogesterone caproate (Chinese Injectable No. 1)
- Estradiol valerate/norethisterone enanthate (Mesigyna, Mesygest)

For menopausal hormone therapy, gynecological disorders, habitual abortion, and other indications:

- Estradiol/progesterone (Juvenum)
- Estradiol benzoate/hydroxyprogesterone caproate (Primosiston)
- Estradiol benzoate/progesterone (Duogynon, Sistocyclin)
- Estradiol dipropionate/hydroxyprogesterone caproate (EP Hormone Depot)
- Estradiol hemisuccinate/progesterone (Hosterona)
- Estradiol pivalate/progesterone (Estrotate with Progesterone)
- Estradiol valerate/hydroxyprogesterone caproate (Gravibinan, Gravibinon)
- Estrone/progesterone (Synergon)

==== Never marketed ====
In combined injectable contraceptives:

- Estradiol/progesterone (in microspheres and macrocrystalline aqueous suspension)
- Estradiol undecylate/norethisterone enanthate
- Estradiol valerate/megestrol acetate
- Estradiol valerate/methenmadinone caproate (Lutofollin)
- Polyestradiol phosphate/medroxyprogesterone acetate
- Additional preparations listed at Combined injectable birth control § Research

For other indications:

- Estradiol valerate/gestonorone caproate (SH-834, SH-8.0834)

=== Veterinary ===
==== Marketed ====
- Estradiol benzoate/progesterone (Component E-S, Implix BM, Synovex C, Synovex S)
- Estradiol valerate/norgestomet (Syncro-Mate-B)

== Androgens and progestogens ==
=== Oral ===
==== Marketed ====
- Methyltestosterone/ethisterone (Androgeston)

=== Injection ===
==== Marketed ====
- Testosterone propionate/progesterone (Testoluton)

=== Veterinary ===
==== Marketed ====
- Danazol/megestrol acetate (Dogalact)
- Nandrolone decanoate/methandriol dipropionate (Filybol, Tribolin)
- Nandrolone phenylpropionate/methandriol dipropionate (RWR)

== Estrogens, progestogens, and androgens ==
=== Oral ===
==== Marketed ====
- Methylestradiol/normethandrone (Ginecosid, Ginecoside, Mediol, Renodiol)

==== Not yet marketed ====
- Ethinylestradiol/drospirenone/prasterone

=== Sublingual ===
==== Marketed ====
- Estradiol/progesterone/methyltestosterone (Trihormonal)
- Ethinylestradiol/ethisterone/methyltestosterone (Trinestryl, Trimone Sublets)

=== Injection ===
==== Marketed ====
- Estradiol benzoate/progesterone/methandriol dipropionate (Progestandron)
- Estradiol benzoate/progesterone/testosterone propionate (Lukestra, Steratrin, Trihormonal, Trinestryl)
- Estradiol benzoate/estradiol valerate/norethisterone acetate/testosterone enanthate (Ablacton)
- Estradiol dibutyrate/hydroxyprogesterone heptanoate/testosterone caproate (Triormon Depositum)
- Estradiol diundecylate/hydroxyprogesterone heptanoate/testosterone cyclohexylpropionate (Trioestrine Retard)
- Estradiol hexahydrobenzoate/hydroxyprogesterone caproate/testosterone hexahydrobenzoate (Trinestril AP)
- Estrone/progesterone/testosterone (Tristeron, Tristerone)

==== Never marketed ====
- Estrapronicate/hydroxyprogesterone heptanoate/nandrolone undecanoate (Trophobolene, Trophoboline)

=== Veterinary ===
==== Marketed ====
- Estradiol/trenbolone acetate (Component, Compudose-G, Progro TE-H, Revalor, Synovex)
- Estradiol benzoate/trenbolone acetate (Synovex Choice, Synovex One, Synovex Plus, Synovex with Trenbolone Acetate)

== Miscellaneous ==
=== Oral ===
==== Marketed ====
- Conjugated estrogens/bazedoxifene (Duavee)

==== Never marketed ====
- Esterified estrogens/raloxifene
- Estradiol/raloxifene

=== Transdermal ===
==== Marketed ====
- Estradiol benzoate/prednisolone/salicylic acid (Alpicort E, Alpicort F, Alpicort Plus)

=== Vaginal ===
==== Marketed ====
- Estradiol benzoate/gentamicin/hydrocortisone/nystatin (Cridermol Fem, Ginabiot, Ginecovan)
- Estradiol benzoate/monalazone (Malun-25)

=== Mixed ===
==== Marketed ====
- Goserelin/bicalutamide (ZolaCos CP)
- Leuprorelin/norethisterone acetate (Lupaneta Pack)

== See also ==
- List of sex-hormonal medications available in the United States
- List of sex-hormonal aqueous suspensions
- List of steroid esters
- List of marketed estradiol benzoate formulations
