= Estradiol benzoate/hydroxyprogesterone caproate =

Combination drug

Estradiol benzoate / hydroxyprogesterone caproate

- Estradiol benzoate (top) and hydroxyprogesterone caproate (bottom)

Combination of
- Estradiol benzoate: Estrogen
- Hydroxyprogesterone caproate: Progestogen

Clinical data
- Trade names: Primosiston, others
- Other names: EB/OHPC
- Routes of administration: Intramuscular injection
- ATC code: G03FA02 (WHO)

Identifiers
- CAS Number: 37218-07-8
- PubChem CID: 21124830
- PubChem SID: 17398118
- ChemSpider: 148551
- KEGG: D04465

Estradiol benzoate/hydroxyprogesterone caproate (EB/OHPC), sold under the brand name Primosiston among others, is a combined estrogen and progestogen medication which is used to treat gynecological disorders and habitual abortion. It contains estradiol benzoate (EB), an estrogen, and hydroxyprogesterone caproate (OHPC), a progestin. The medication is given by injection into muscle.

== Medical uses ==
EB/OHPC is used in the treatment of gynecological disorders such as menstrual disorders (e.g., amenorrhea, dysfunctional uterine bleeding) and premenstrual syndrome, habitual abortion (threatened miscarriage), and for other indications.

=== Available forms ===
EB/OHPC is available in the form of ampoules of oil solutions containing 10 mg estradiol benzoate (EB) and 125 to 250 mg hydroxyprogesterone caproate (OHPC).

== History ==
EB/OHPC was first introduced for medical use in 1955.

== Society and culture ==
=== Brand names ===
EB/OHPC has been marketed under brand names including Dos Dias N, Lutes, Ostrolut, Primosiston (or Primosiston Inj. / Injection), Primosiston Fuerte, and Syngynon.

=== Availability ===
EB/OHPC has been mostly discontinued and hence is mostly no longer available. It remains marketed under the brand names Primosiston in Ecuador and Peru, Dos Dias N in Argentina, and Lutes in Japan. It was previously marketed under the brand names Ostrolut in Austria; Primosiston (or Primosiston Inj. / Injection) (Schering) in Argentina, Germany, Mexico, Switzerland, and Venezuela; Primosiston Fuerte in Spain; and Syngynon in Germany, but these formulations have all been discontinued and hence are no longer available in these countries.

== See also ==
- Estradiol dipropionate/hydroxyprogesterone caproate
- Estradiol valerate/hydroxyprogesterone caproate
- Estradiol benzoate/progesterone
- List of combined sex-hormonal preparations
