= Estradiol/megestrol acetate =

Pharmaceutical combination

Estradiol / megestrol acetate

- Estradiol (top) and megestrol acetate (bottom)

Combination of
- Estradiol: Estrogen
- Megestrol acetate: Progestogen

Clinical data
- Trade names: Mego-E, Chinese injectable No. 2
- Other names: E2/MGA
- Routes of administration: Intramuscular injection

Identifiers
- CAS Number: 88923-79-9

Estradiol/megestrol acetate (E2/MGA), sold under the brand names Mego-E and Chinese injectable No. 2, is a form of combined injectable birth control which is used in the People's Republic of China. It contains 3.5 mg estradiol (E2), an estrogen, and 25 mg megestrol acetate (MGA), a progestin. It is a microcrystalline aqueous suspension with a defined particle size range. The medication is given once per month by injection into muscle.

Studies of E2/MGA have been published. The elimination half-life of MGA in this formulation is 14.35 ± 9.1 days. The plasma protein binding of MGA to albumin is 82.4%, while none is bound to sex hormone-binding globulin. Following an injection of E2/MGA, estradiol increased after 24 hours and persisted at high levels for 5 days, thereafter decreasing to low levels.

In 1969, MGA was studied in China as an aqueous suspension for parenteral administration in animals. The next year, it was studied in women as a progestogen-only injectable contraceptive, with a dosing interval of once every 3 months by intramuscular injection. It was effective as a contraceptive but was associated with menstrual irregularities. Starting in 1973, a combination of estradiol cypionate (EC) and MGA was studied in women as a combined injectable contraceptive over a period of 3 years. E2/MGA, an "improvement" of EC/MGA, was studied in China in large clinical trials from 1977 to 1979 and was approved for use in this country in 1980. By 1987, production of E2/MGA had reached 9 million units per year and had spread to over 22 Chinese provinces and cities. E2/MGA appears to have been discontinued sometime between 2005 and 2008.

A follow-up product consisting of 5 mg estradiol valerate (EV) and 15 mg MGA encapsulated in 50 to 80 μm-diameter microspheres as an aqueous suspension for use by intramuscular injection was developed and studied in China as well but was never marketed. Following an injection, levels of MGA were higher than 2 ng/mL after a day, reached a peak of 3.2 ng/mL after 8 days, remained at levels of 2 ng/mL after 27 days, remained at 1 to 2 ng/mL after 27 to 45 days, and were below 1 ng/mL after 45 to 51 days (0.71 ng/mL on the 51st day).

== See also ==
- Combined injectable birth control § Available forms
- List of combined sex-hormonal preparations
- List of sex-hormonal aqueous suspensions
