= Estradiol/norethisterone acetate =

Pharmaceutical combination

Combination of
- Estradiol: Estrogen
- Norethisterone acetate: Progestogen

Clinical data
- Trade names: Activella, Amabelz, CombiPatch, others
- AHFS/Drugs.com: Professional Drug Facts
- MedlinePlus: a601041
- Routes of administration: By mouth
- ATC code: G03FA01 (WHO)

Legal status
- Legal status: US: ℞-only

Identifiers
- CAS Number: 77728-33-7
- ChemSpider: none

Estradiol/norethisterone acetate (E2/NETA), sold under the brand names Activella and Activelle among others, is a combination of estradiol (E2) and norethisterone acetate (NETA) which is used in the treatment of vasomotor symptoms, vulvar and vaginal atrophy, and osteoporosis associated with menopause. Activella specifically is marketed by Novo and is supplied as film-coated tablets containing 1 mg estradiol and 0.5 mg norethisterone acetate. CombiPatch is a combination of estradiol and NETA provided as a transdermal patch.

== See also ==
- Ethinylestradiol/norethisterone acetate
- Ethinylestradiol/norelgestromin
- Estradiol/levonorgestrel
- List of combined sex-hormonal preparations
