= Estradiol/raloxifene =

Combination drug

Combination of
- Estradiol: Estrogen
- Raloxifene: Selective estrogen receptor modulator

Clinical data
- Other names: E2/RLX; Raloxifene/estradiol; RLX/E2
- Routes of administration: By mouth; Transdermal administration; Vaginal administration

Legal status
- Legal status: US: ℞-only

Estradiol/raloxifene (E2/RLX) is a tissue-selective estrogen complex (TSEC) which was studied for potential use in menopausal hormone therapy but was never marketed. Today, E2/RLX is not generally used due to concerns of endometrial hyperplasia.

== See also ==
- List of combined sex-hormonal preparations
