= Estradiol valerate/megestrol acetate =

Combination drug

Estradiol valerate / megestrol acetate

- Estradiol valerate (top) and megestrol acetate (bottom)

Combination of
- Estradiol valerate: Estrogen
- Megestrol acetate: Progestogen

Clinical data
- Other names: EV/MGA
- Routes of administration: Intramuscular injection (microcapsules)

Estradiol valerate/megestrol acetate (EV/MGA) is a combined injectable contraceptive which was developed in China in the 1980s but was never marketed. It is an aqueous suspension of microcapsules (50–80 μm in diameter) containing 5 mg estradiol valerate (EV) and 15 mg megestrol acetate (MGA). It was also studied at doses of EV ranging from 0.5 to 5 mg and at doses of MGA ranging from 15 to 25 mg.

== See also ==
- List of combined sex-hormonal preparations § Estrogens and progestogens
- Combined injectable birth control § Research
