= Estradiol dipropionate/hydroxyprogesterone caproate =

Pharmaceutical combination

Estradiol dipropionate / hydroxyprogesterone caproate

- Estradiol dipropionate (top) and hydroxyprogesterone caproate (bottom)

Combination of
- Estradiol dipropionate: Estrogen
- Hydroxyprogesterone caproate: Progestogen

Clinical data
- Trade names: EP Hormone Depot
- Other names: EDP/OHPC
- Routes of administration: Intramuscular injection
- ATC code: G03FA02 (WHO)

Identifiers
- PubChem SID: 17398112
- KEGG: D04457

Estradiol dipropionate/hydroxyprogesterone caproate (EDP/OHPC), sold under the brand name EP Hormone Depot, is a combined estrogen–progestogen medication which is used in Japan. It is manufactured by Teikoku Zoki Pharmaceutical Co., Tokyo and contains 1 mg/mL estradiol dipropionate and 50 mg/mL hydroxyprogesterone caproate.

== See also ==
- Estradiol benzoate/hydroxyprogesterone caproate
- Estradiol valerate/hydroxyprogesterone caproate
- List of combined sex-hormonal preparations
