= A.T. Mine E.P. Mark II =

- Type: Anti-tank mine
- Place of origin: UK

Service history
- Used by: UK
- Wars: World War II

Specifications
- Height: 4 in (100 mm)
- Diameter: 10 in (250 mm)
- Filling: TNT
- Filling weight: 4.5 lb (2.0 kg)

The Anti-Tank Mine Egyptian Pattern Mark II was a British anti-tank mine used in World War II, produced near Cairo for use in extensive minefields in the North African campaign.

== Design ==
The mine is circular with a diameter of 10 inches (250 mm), and a height of 4 inches (100 mm). It has a mushroom shaped cover, indicating it to be in active use, which is held to the mine by four hooked straps consequently attached to a wire on the mine's bottom, keeping the cover in place. The mine has its fuse well in the center.

The side of the mine houses a channel close to the bottom, which permits access to the mine's center fuse. A small metal tab can be used to close off the channel, making the mine safe. For example, it is used for transporting and/or storage.

The mine is detonated when the pressure of a vehicle on the top of the mine forces the plunger inside the mine. It is forced downward through a shear pin. The pin goes onto an ampoule cartridge. With its downward momentum, the plunger crushes the cartridge. It initiates a chemical reaction that activates the mine.

== Arming, disarming, and disposal ==
Arming this mine involves sealing an ampoule cartridge into the detonator. The steel rod that occupies the hole during transport is then replaced with the detonator. The last step is to bend the metal tab over the detonator assembly and place the mine.

Disarming the mine is only possible if the detonator assembly can be removed without excessive force.

Typically, the mine is safely destroyed instead of being disarmed.

== Service ==
With Egyptian origin, the mine saw extensive service by United Kingdom, a Commonwealth of defensive positions, realized during the North African campaign.
