= Estrone/progesterone/testosterone =

Combination drug

E1/P4/T
Combination of
- Estrone: Estrogen
- Progesterone: Progestogen
- Testosterone: Androgen; Anabolic steroid

Clinical data
- Trade names: Tristeron, Tristerone
- Other names: E1/P4/T
- Routes of administration: Intramuscular injection

Estrone/progesterone/testosterone (E1/P4/T), sold under the brand name Tristeron or Tristerone, is an injectable combination medication of estrone (E1), an estrogen, progesterone (P4), a progestogen, and testosterone (T), an androgen/anabolic steroid, which was used in the treatment of functional uterine bleeding in women. It contained 6 mg estrone, 50 mg progesterone, and 25 mg testosterone in microcrystalline aqueous suspension and was administered by intramuscular injection. The medication was manufactured by Wyeth and was marketed by 1951. It is no longer available.

== See also ==
- List of combined sex-hormonal preparations § Estrogens, progestogens, and androgens
