= Estradiol valerate/hydroxyprogesterone caproate =

Pharmaceutical combination

Estradiol valerate / hydroxyprogesterone caproate

- Estradiol valerate (top) and hydroxyprogesterone caproate (bottom)

Combination of
- Estradiol valerate: Estrogen
- Hydroxyprogesterone caproate: Progestogen

Clinical data
- Trade names: Gravibinon, Injectable No. 1, others
- Other names: EV/OHPC; NSC-77622
- Routes of administration: Intramuscular injection

Identifiers
- CAS Number: 979-32-8; 630-56-8
- PubChem CID: 254017
- UNII: OKG364O896; 276F2O42F5

Estradiol valerate/hydroxyprogesterone caproate (EV/OHPC), sold under the brand names Gravibinon and Injectable No. 1 (or Chinese Injectable No. 1) among others, is a combined estrogen and progestogen medication which is used in the treatment of threatened miscarriage and other indications (e.g., as a means of pseudopregnancy) and as a form of combined injectable birth control to prevent pregnancy. It contains estradiol valerate (EV), an estrogen, and hydroxyprogesterone caproate (OHPC), a progestin. The medication is given by injection into muscle once a day to once a month depending on the indication.

== Medical uses ==
EV/OHPC has been used in the treatment of threatened miscarriage (habitual abortion) and for other indications under the brand name Gravibinon among others in Europe and Latin America. The combination has also been used as a form of pseudopregnancy (high-dose estrogen/progestogen therapy), for instance to treat osteopenia due to hypogonadism, to induce feminization in hypogonadism/delayed puberty, and as a means of hormonal breast enhancement to produce breast enlargement. EV/OHPC is administered daily to once per week or less often for the treatment of threatened miscarriage, for use as a form of pseudopregnancy, and for other indications.

EV/OHPC is used as a combined injectable contraceptive to prevent pregnancy in women under the brand name Injectable No. 1 (or Chinese Injectable No. 1) in China as well. When used as a combined injectable contraceptive, EV/OHPC is given twice in the first month and then once per month thereafter.

=== Available forms ===
EV/OHPC is available for general use (e.g., as Gravibinon) in the form of ampoules containing 5 to 10 mg estradiol valerate (EV) and 250 to 500 mg hydroxyprogesterone caproate (OHPC). It is available for use as a combined injectable contraceptive specifically at a dose of 5 mg EV and 250 mg OHPC.

== Side effects ==
EV/OHPC as a combined injectable contraceptive has a relatively short duration and is associated with a high incidence of menstrual irregularity, for instance polymenorrhea (short and hence fast cycles). This may be unacceptable to many women. Twice-monthly administration of half doses has not been found to improve breakthrough bleeding, though cycle length increased to 20 to 24 days.

== History ==
EV/OHPC was reportedly first introduced for medical use in 1955. The medication was developed by Schering and marketed under the brand name Gravibinon for the treatment of habitual abortion in Europe by the late 1960s.

EV/OHPC was the first combined injectable contraceptive to be studied. It was first evaluated by Siegel and colleagues in 1963. The doses used in their study were 10 mg EV and 500 mg OHPC. Around the same time as the Siegel study, a half-dose formulation containing 5 mg EV and 250 mg OHPC was developed and subsequently marketed for use in China under the brand name Injectable No. 1 (or Chinese Injectable No. 1). The formulation was also reported to be marketed in a few countries neighboring China. EV/OHPC was also studied at the same dose by a "major European pharmaceutical company" in 1971, but was found to produce short menstrual cycles of 17 to 18 days with once-monthly administration and 20 to 24 days with twice-monthly administration. As a result of these menstrual disturbances, the company abandoned development of the formulation.

EV/OHPC was one of only two combined injectable contraceptives to have been marketed by 1976, and was one of only three combined injectable contraceptives with considerable clinical experience by 1976. The others were estradiol enanthate/algestone acetophenide (E2-EN/DHPA; brand names Perlutal, Topasel), which had been marketed in Spain and Latin America, and estradiol cypionate/medroxyprogesterone acetate (EC/MPA; code name Cyclo-Provera), which was still experimental by 1976 and did not become formally available for clinical use until the 1990s. By 1994, at which point EC/MPA (brand names Cyclofem and later Lunelle) and estradiol valerate/norethisterone enanthate (EV/NETE; brand name Mesigyna) had been introduced, EV/OHPC had been in use for many years.

EV/OHPC and E2-EN/DHPA have been referred to as first-generation combined injectable contraceptives, while EC/MPA and EV/NETE have been referred to as second-generation combined injectable contraceptives.

== Society and culture ==
=== Brand names ===
EV/OHPC has been marketed under the brand names Deluteval (or Deluteval 2X), Gravibinon, Gravibinan, Gravidinona, and Gestadinona for the treatment of threatened abortion and other general uses. It has been marketed under the brand name Injectable No. 1 or Chinese Injectable No. 1 for use as a combined injectable contraceptive.

=== Availability ===
EV/OHPC is marketed under the brand names Gravidinona in Mexico and Gestadinona in Brazil for threatened abortion. It was also marketed under the brand name Gravidinona in Chile but was discontinued in this country. EV/OHPC was also marketed under the brand names Gravibinon (Schering) in Austria, Belgium, and Germany and Gravibinan (Schering) in France, Italy, and Turkey for threatened abortion as well, but has been discontinued in these countries. EV/OHPC is marketed for use as a combined injectable contraceptive under the brand name Injectable No. 1 or Chinese Injectable No.1 in the China.

=== Usage ===
It was estimated in 1995 that EV/OHPC had been used as a combined injectable contraceptive in China by about 1 million women. However, combined injectable contraceptives like EV/OHPC are unlikely to constitute a large proportion of contraceptive use in the countries in which they are available.

== See also ==
- Combined injectable birth control § Available forms
- Estradiol benzoate/hydroxyprogesterone caproate
- Estradiol dipropionate/hydroxyprogesterone caproate
- List of combined sex-hormonal preparations
