= Estradiol/progesterone =

Pharmaceutical combination

- Estradiol (top) and progesterone (bottom)

Combination of
- Estradiol: Estrogen
- Progesterone: Progestogen

Clinical data
- Trade names: Bijuva, Juvenum, Lutes
- Other names: E2/P4; TX-001HR; TX-12-001HR; CA682-2
- License data: US DailyMed: Estradiol and progesterone
- Routes of administration: By mouth, intramuscular injection
- ATC code: G03FA04 (WHO)

Legal status
- Legal status: AU: S4 (Prescription only); CA: ℞-only; US: ℞-only

Identifiers
- KEGG: D04459
- CompTox Dashboard (EPA): DTXSID70230433

Estradiol/progesterone (E2/P4), sold under the brand name Bijuva among others, is a combined estrogen and progestogen medication which is used in the treatment of menopausal symptoms in postmenopausal women. It contains estradiol, an estrogen, and progesterone, a progestogen, and is available in both oral and intramuscular formulations. E2/P4 differs from other estrogen–progestogen formulations in that the sex-hormonal agents used are bioidentical.

Estradiol/progesterone is an oral combination of estradiol (E2), an estrogen, and progesterone (P4), a progestogen, which was developed by TherapeuticsMD and is approved in the United States for the treatment of menopausal symptoms in women. It is also under development for the treatment of endometrial hyperplasia in women. The medication contains 2 mg solubilized E2 and 200 mg P4 in each gelatin capsule. It is the first combination of E2 and P4 in oral capsule form that has been developed for clinical use. Bijuva is currently in phase III clinical trials for endometrial hyperplasia. The medication was approved by the Food and Drug Administration for the treatment of menopausal symptoms in October 2018. It is available as a generic medication.

E2/P4 is available as an aqueous suspension of E2 and P4 encapsulated in microspheres for use by intramuscular injection under the brand name Juvenum in Mexico. It was introduced for the treatment and prevention of menopausal symptoms like hot flashes, vulvovaginal symptoms, and osteoporosis in December 2014. The combination contains relatively low doses of E2 and P4 (1 mg and 20 mg, respectively) contained within microspheres that results in a slower release of the hormones. Studies of this formulation have been published.

E2/P4 with 5 mg E2 and 150 to 300 mg P4 encapsulated in microspheres in an aqueous suspension has been studied as a once-a-month combined injectable contraceptive but has not been further developed or introduced for medical use. E2/P4 with 5 mg E2 and 100 mg P4 in a macrocrystalline aqueous suspension has also been studied as a once-a-month combined injectable contraceptive, but likewise was not further developed.

== Research ==
As of April 2022, a vaginal ring containing E2/P4 (developmental code names DARE-HRT1 and JNP-0201) is under development for use in menopausal hormone therapy.
