= Estradiol benzoate/progesterone =

Drug combination

- Estradiol benzoate (top) and progesterone (bottom)

Combination of
- Estradiol benzoate: Estrogen
- Progesterone: Progestogen

Clinical data
- Trade names: Clinomin Forte, Duogynon, Lutrogen, Sistocyclin, Vermagest, others
- Other names: EB/P4
- Routes of administration: Intramuscular injection (oil solution, aqueous suspension)
- ATC code: G03FA04 (WHO)

Identifiers
- CAS Number: 50-50-0 8000-03-1 (mixture); 57-83-0
- PubChem CID: 66441
- ChemSpider: 59814
- UNII: 1S4CJB5ZGN; 4G7DS2Q64Y

Estradiol benzoate/progesterone (EB/P4), sold under the brand names Duogynon and Sistocyclin among others, is a combination medication of estradiol benzoate (EB), an estrogen, and progesterone (P4), a progestogen. It has been formulated both as short-acting oil solutions and long-acting microcrystalline aqueous suspensions and is given by injection into muscle either once or continuously at regular intervals.

EB/P4 was one of the first combined estrogen and progestogen medications to be introduced for medical use. It was first marketed in Germany as an oil solution in 1950. Microcrystalline EB/P4 in aqueous suspension was developed and marketed under the brand name Sistocyclin several years later. EB/P4 was eventually superseded by longer-acting parenteral estrogen–progestogen combinations as well as by oral estrogen–progestogen combinations.

== Medical uses ==
EB/P4 has been used to treat menstrual disorders such as secondary amenorrhea and menstrual irregularity, as a form of emergency contraception within 48 hours of sexual intercourse, and as a test for pregnancy. In the form of a microcrystalline aqueous suspension, EB/P4 has particularly been used to treat functional uterine bleeding.

EB/P4 has been studied in the treatment of breast cancer in women and found to be effective.

=== Available forms ===
EB/P4 is or has been available for use by intramuscular injection both in the form of short-acting oil solutions (e.g., Duogynon, Lutrogen) and long-acting microcrystalline aqueous suspensions (e.g., Clinomin Forte, Sistocyclin). These are provided as ampoules, with the oil-solution ampoules containing 2–3 mg EB and 12.5–50 mg progesterone and the aqueous-suspension ampoules containing 10 mg EB and 200 mg progesterone. The crystal sizes in microcrystalline EB/P4 in aqueous suspension (Sistocyclin) are 0.01 to 0.02 mm for EB crystals and 0.02 to 0.1 mm for P4 crystals. An oil-solution ampoule containing 30 mg EB and 30 mg P4 (brand name Vermagest) is used as an injectable emergency contraceptive. Clinomin Forte is an aqueous suspension of EB/P4 that additionally contains lidocaine and remains available today.

== Pharmacology ==
=== Pharmacodynamics ===
EB is an estrogen, or an agonist of the estrogen receptors, the biological target of estrogens like endogenous estradiol. It is an estradiol ester and prodrug of estradiol with a longer duration of action than estradiol when administered by intramuscular injection in oil solution or aqueous suspension. P4 is a progestogen, or an agonist of the progesterone receptors, the biological target of progestogens like endogenous progesterone.

The full endometrial transformation dosage of EB/P4 in oil solution is 1 to 2 mg EB and 20 to 25 mg P4 by intramuscular injection daily for 10 to 14 days, whereas the full endometrial transformation dosage of EB/P4 in microcrystalline aqueous suspension is a single intramuscular injection of 10 mg EB and 200 mg P4. For comparison, the full endometrial transformation dosage of estradiol valerate and hydroxyprogesterone caproate in oil solution (brand name Gravibinon) is a single intramuscular injection of 10 mg estradiol valerate and 250 to 375 mg hydroxyprogesterone caproate. Endometrial transformation normally occurs during the luteal phase of the menstrual cycle; it is induced by endogenous progesterone following adequate priming by endogenous estradiol.

The decidua (pregnancy-type endometrium) induction dosage of EB/P4 in oil solution is 2 to 5 mg EB and 20 to 100 mg P4 by intramuscular injection daily for 5 to 7 weeks, whereas the decidua induction dosage of EB/P4 in microcrystalline aqueous suspension is 10 to 20 mg EB and 200 to 250 mg P4 in microcrystalline aqueous suspension by intramuscular injection once per week for about 6 weeks. For comparison, the decidua induction dosage of estradiol valerate and hydroxyprogesterone caproate in oil solution is about the same as that of microcrystalline EB/P4 in aqueous suspension. The decidua induction dosages of estrogen and progestogen combinations are pseudopregnancy dosages.

=== Pharmacokinetics ===
EB/P4 is administered by intramuscular injection a single time or continuously at regular intervals, depending on the indication. Amorphous EB/P4 in oil solution (e.g., Duogynon, Lutrogen) is reported to have a duration of action of 2 days in terms of the progestogen component, and hence is a short-acting preparation, whereas microcrystalline EB/P4 in aqueous suspension (e.g., Sistocyclin) has a duration of 10 to 12 days, and hence is a long-acting preparation. A study found that a single intramuscular injection of 10 mg microcrystalline EB in aqueous suspension with a 0.05 mm crystal size (similar to that in Sistocyclin) resulted in a maximal 7-fold increase in estradiol excretion on the 2nd day after injection and maintained elevated estradiol excretion for 17 days.

Potencies and durations of natural estrogens by intramuscular injection
Estrogen	Form	Dose (mg)		Duration by dose (mg)
Estrogen	Form	EPD	CICD	Duration by dose (mg)
Estradiol	Aq. soln.	?	–	<1 d
Estradiol	Oil soln.	40–60	–	1–2 ≈ 1–2 d
Estradiol	Aq. susp.	?	3.5	0.5–2 ≈ 2–7 d; 3.5 ≈ >5 d
Estradiol	Microsph.	?	–	1 ≈ 30 d
Estradiol benzoate	Oil soln.	25–35	–	1.66 ≈ 2–3 d; 5 ≈ 3–6 d
Estradiol benzoate	Aq. susp.	20	–	10 ≈ 16–21 d
Estradiol benzoate	Emulsion	?	–	10 ≈ 14–21 d
Estradiol dipropionate	Oil soln.	25–30	–	5 ≈ 5–8 d
Estradiol valerate	Oil soln.	20–30	5	5 ≈ 7–8 d; 10 ≈ 10–14 d; 40 ≈ 14–21 d; 100 ≈ 21–28 d
Estradiol benz. butyrate	Oil soln.	?	10	10 ≈ 21 d
Estradiol cypionate	Oil soln.	20–30	–	5 ≈ 11–14 d
Estradiol cypionate	Aq. susp.	?	5	5 ≈ 14–24 d
Estradiol enanthate	Oil soln.	?	5–10	10 ≈ 20–30 d
Estradiol dienanthate	Oil soln.	?	–	7.5 ≈ >40 d
Estradiol undecylate	Oil soln.	?	–	10–20 ≈ 40–60 d; 25–50 ≈ 60–120 d
Polyestradiol phosphate	Aq. soln.	40–60	–	40 ≈ 30 d; 80 ≈ 60 d; 160 ≈ 120 d
Estrone	Oil soln.	?	–	1–2 ≈ 2–3 d
Estrone	Aq. susp.	?	–	0.1–2 ≈ 2–7 d
Estriol	Oil soln.	?	–	1–2 ≈ 1–4 d
Polyestriol phosphate	Aq. soln.	?	–	50 ≈ 30 d; 80 ≈ 60 d
Notes and sources Notes: All aqueous suspensions are of microcrystalline particle size. Estradiol production during the menstrual cycle is 30–640 µg/d (6.4–8.6 mg total per month or cycle). The vaginal epithelium maturation dosage of estradiol benzoate or estradiol valerate has been reported as 5 to 7 mg/week. An effective ovulation-inhibiting dose of estradiol undecylate is 20–30 mg/month. Sources: See template.

Parenteral potencies and durations of progestogens (Note: Sources:) (Note: All given by intramuscular or subcutaneous injection.)
Compound	Form	Dose for specific uses (mg) (Note: Progesterone production during the luteal phase is ~25 (15–50) mg/day. The OID of OHPC is 250 to 500 mg/month.)			DOA (Note: Duration of action in days.)
Compound	Form	TFD (Note: Usually given for 14 days.)	POICD (Note: Usually dosed every two to three months.)	CICD (Note: Usually dosed once monthly.)	DOA
Algestone acetophenide	Oil soln.	–	–	75–150	14–32 d
Gestonorone caproate	Oil soln.	25–50	–	–	8–13 d
Hydroxyprogest. acetate (Note: Never marketed or approved by this route.)	Aq. susp.	350	–	–	9–16 d
Hydroxyprogest. caproate	Oil soln.	250–500 (Note: In divided doses (2 × 125 or 250 mg for OHPC, 10 × 20 mg for P4).)	–	250–500	5–21 d
Medroxyprog. acetate	Aq. susp.	50–100	150	25	14–50+ d
Megestrol acetate	Aq. susp.	–	–	25	>14 d
Norethisterone enanthate	Oil soln.	100–200	200	50	11–52 d
Progesterone	Oil soln.	200	–	–	2–6 d
Progesterone	Aq. soln.	?	–	–	1–2 d
Progesterone	Aq. susp.	50–200	–	–	7–14 d
Notes and sources:

== History ==
EB/P4 in oil solution for use by intramuscular injection was first marketed in Germany in 1950. It was one of the first combined estrogen and progestogen medications to be introduced for medical use. To achieve a longer duration of action, microcrystalline EB/P4 with defined crystal sizes in aqueous suspension was developed, studied in 1954, and marketed under the brand name Sistocyclin shortly thereafter in the 1950s. Formulations containing a combination of EB or estradiol valerate (an estradiol ester with a longer duration than EB) and the longer-acting synthetic progestogen hydroxyprogesterone caproate in oil solution (brand names Primosiston, Gravibinon) were introduced in 1955 and eventually superseded EB/P4. Oral estrogen–progestogen combinations, such as mestranol/noretynodrel (brand name Enovid), were also introduced in the 1950s, and soon replaced EB/P4 for menstrual and other indications as well.

== Society and culture ==
=== Brand names ===
EB/P4 has been marketed under a large number of brand names including Component E-C, Component E-S, Di Pro Oleosum, Duogynon, Duogynon ampule, Duogynon forte, Duogynon simplex, Duoton Fort T P, Emmenovis, Estroprogyn, Gestrygen, Implus-C, Implus S, Jephagynon, Klimovan, Limovanil, Lutofolone, Menovis, Menstrogen Forte, Mestrolar, Metrigen Fuerte, Nomestrol, Phenokinon-F, Pro-Estramon-S, Prodiol, Proger F, Progestediol, Sistocyclin, Synovex C, Synovex S, and Tonevex S.

=== Availability ===
EB/P4 was originally developed and marketed in Europe. Today, it is available in a number of places in the world including various Latin American countries, Egypt, Italy, Lebanon, Taiwan, Thailand, Turkey, Malaysia, and Ethiopia. EB/P4 is available specifically as an injectable emergency contraceptive in El Salvador, Honduras, and Nicaragua.

EB/P4 in oil solution remains widely available throughout the world. Conversely, Sistocyclin, or microcrystalline EB/P4 in aqueous suspension, is no longer marketed. However, individual formulations of microcrystalline EB in aqueous suspension (brand name Agofollin Depot) and microcrystalline P4 in aqueous suspension (brand name Agolutin Depot) remain available in some countries, including the Czech Republic and Slovakia.

== Veterinary uses ==
EB/P4 is used in veterinary medicine under the brand names Component E-C, Component E-S, Synovex C, and Synovex S, among others.

== See also ==
- List of combined sex-hormonal preparations § Estrogens and progestogens
- List of sex-hormonal aqueous suspensions
