= Estradiol benzoate =

Chemical compound

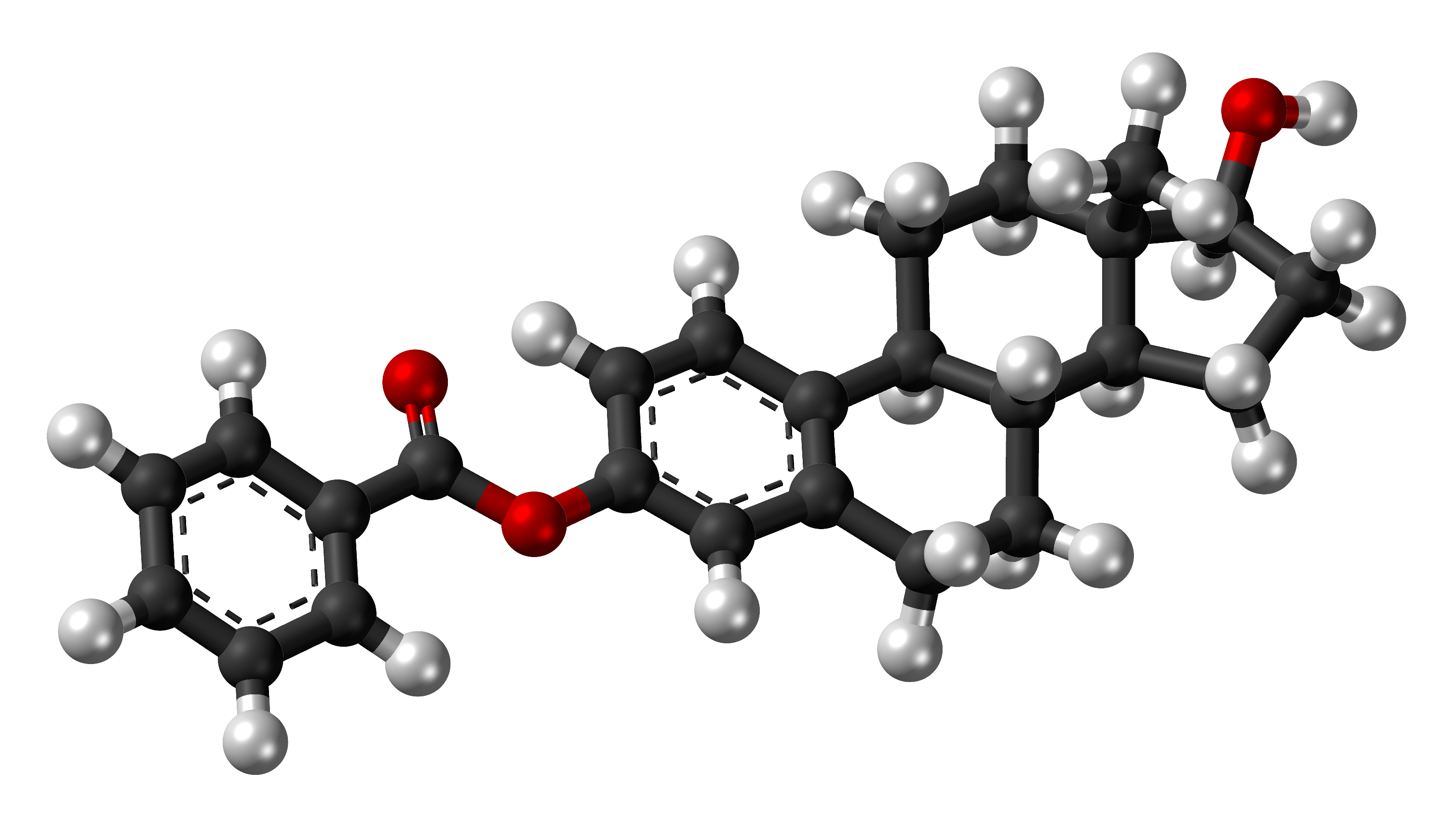

Clinical data
- Pronunciation: /ˌɛstrəˈdaɪoʊl ˈbɛnzoʊeɪt/ ES-trə-DY-ohl BEN-zoh-ayt
- Trade names: Agofollin Depot, Ben-Ovocylin, Benzofoline, Dimenformon, Ovocyclin M, Progynon-B, many others
- Other names: EB; E2B; Oestradiol benzoate; 17β-Estradiol-3-benzoate; NSC-9566; Benzhormovarine, Difollisterol, Follicormon, Follidimyl, Follidrinbensoat, Oestro-Vitis, Oestroform
- Routes of administration: Intramuscular injection, subcutaneous injection, vaginal
- Drug class: Estrogen; Estrogen ester
- ATC code: G03CA03 (WHO)

Legal status
- Legal status: In general: ℞ (Prescription only)

Pharmacokinetic data
- Bioavailability: IM: High
- Protein binding: Estradiol: ~98% (to albumin and SHBG)
- Metabolism: Cleavage via esterases in the liver, blood, and tissues
- Metabolites: Estradiol, benzoic acid, and metabolites of estradiol
- Elimination half-life: IM: 48–120 hrs (2–5 days)
- Duration of action: IM (0.3–1.7 mg): 2–3 days IM (5 mg): 4–6 days
- Excretion: Urine

Identifiers
- IUPAC name: [(8R,9S,13S,14S,17S)-17-hydroxy-13-methyl-6,7,8,9,11,12,14,15,16,17-decahydrocyclopenta[a]phenanthren-3-yl] benzoate
- CAS Number: 50-50-0
- PubChem CID: 222757
- DrugBank: DB13953
- ChemSpider: 193412
- UNII: 1S4CJB5ZGN
- KEGG: D01953
- ChEBI: CHEBI:77006
- ChEMBL: ChEMBL282575
- CompTox Dashboard (EPA): DTXSID9022998
- ECHA InfoCard: 100.000.040

Chemical and physical data
- Formula: C_{25}H_{28}O_{3}
- Molar mass: 376.496 g·mol^{−1}
- 3D model (JSmol): Interactive image
- SMILES: C[C@]12CC[C@H]3[C@H]([C@@H]1CC[C@@H]2O)CCC4=C3C=CC(=C4)OC(=O)C5=CC=CC=C5
- InChI: InChI=1S/C25H28O3/c1-25-14-13-20-19-10-8-18(28-24(27)16-5-3-2-4-6-16)15-17(19)7-9-21(20)22(25)11-12-23(25)26/h2-6,8,10,15,20-23,26H,7,9,11-14H2,1H3/t20-,21-,22+,23+,25+/m1/s1; Key:UYIFTLBWAOGQBI-BZDYCCQFSA-N

Estradiol benzoate (EB), sold under the brand name Progynon-B among others, is an estrogen medication which is used in hormone therapy for menopausal symptoms and low estrogen levels in women, in hormone therapy for transgender women, and in the treatment of gynecological disorders. It is also used in the treatment of prostate cancer in men. Estradiol benzoate is used in veterinary medicine as well. When used clinically, the medication is given by injection into muscle usually two to three times per week.

Side effects of estradiol benzoate include breast tenderness, breast enlargement, nausea, headache, and fluid retention. Estradiol benzoate is an estrogen and hence is an agonist of the estrogen receptor, the biological target of estrogens like estradiol. It is an estrogen ester and a prodrug of estradiol in the body. Because of this, it is considered to be a natural and bioidentical form of estrogen.

Estradiol benzoate was discovered in 1933 and was introduced for medical use that same year. It was the first estradiol ester to be discovered or marketed, and was one of the first estrogens to be used in medicine. Along with estradiol dipropionate, estradiol benzoate was among the most widely used esters of estradiol for many years following its introduction. However, in the 1950s, longer-acting estradiol esters that necessitated less frequent injections, such as estradiol valerate and estradiol cypionate, were developed, and have since largely superseded estradiol benzoate. Nonetheless, estradiol benzoate remains widely available throughout the world. It is not available for medical use in the United States, but is available there for use in veterinary medicine.

== Medical uses ==
The medical uses of estradiol benzoate are the same as those of estradiol and other estrogens. Estradiol benzoate is used in hormone therapy for the treatment of menopausal symptoms such as hot flashes and vaginal atrophy and in the treatment of hypoestrogenism and delayed puberty due to hypogonadism or other causes in women. It is also used in hormone therapy for transgender women. Aside from hormone therapy, estradiol benzoate is used in the treatment of gynecological disorders such as menstrual disorders, dysfunctional uterine bleeding, and breast engorgement. In addition, it is used as a form of high-dose estrogen therapy in the palliative treatment of prostate cancer in men.

Estradiol benzoate has a relatively short duration of action, and is administered by intramuscular injection usually two to three times per week. It is used in the treatment of menopausal symptoms at a dosage of 1 to 1.66 mg initially and 0.33 to 1 mg for maintenance two times per week, and in the treatment of hypoestrogenism and delayed puberty at a dosage of 1.66 mg two to three times per week. The dosage used in hormone therapy for transgender women is 0.5 to 1.5 mg two to three times per week. In the treatment of prostate cancer, estradiol benzoate is used at a dosage of 1.66 mg three times per week (for a total of 5 mg per week).

Estrogen dosages for menopausal hormone therapy
Route/form	Estrogen	Low	Standard	High
Oral	Estradiol	0.5–1 mg/day	1–2 mg/day	2–4 mg/day
Oral	Estradiol valerate	0.5–1 mg/day	1–2 mg/day	2–4 mg/day
Oral	Estradiol acetate	0.45–0.9 mg/day	0.9–1.8 mg/day	1.8–3.6 mg/day
Oral	Conjugated estrogens	0.3–0.45 mg/day	0.625 mg/day	0.9–1.25 mg/day
Oral	Esterified estrogens	0.3–0.45 mg/day	0.625 mg/day	0.9–1.25 mg/day
Oral	Estropipate	0.75 mg/day	1.5 mg/day	3 mg/day
Oral	Estriol	1–2 mg/day	2–4 mg/day	4–8 mg/day
Oral	Ethinylestradiol^{a}	2.5–10 μg/day	5–20 μg/day	–
Nasal spray	Estradiol	150 μg/day	300 μg/day	600 μg/day
Transdermal patch	Estradiol	25 μg/day^{b}	50 μg/day^{b}	100 μg/day^{b}
Transdermal gel	Estradiol	0.5 mg/day	1–1.5 mg/day	2–3 mg/day
Vaginal	Estradiol	25 μg/day	–	–
Vaginal	Estriol	30 μg/day	0.5 mg 2x/week	0.5 mg/day
IM or SC injection	Estradiol valerate	–	–	4 mg 1x/4 weeks
IM or SC injection	Estradiol cypionate	1 mg 1x/3–4 weeks	3 mg 1x/3–4 weeks	5 mg 1x/3–4 weeks
IM or SC injection	Estradiol benzoate	0.5 mg 1x/week	1 mg 1x/week	1.5 mg 1x/week
SC implant	Estradiol	25 mg 1x/6 months	50 mg 1x/6 months	100 mg 1x/6 months
Footnotes: ^{a} = No longer used or recommended, due to health concerns. ^{b} = As a single patch applied once or twice per week (worn for 3–4 days or 7 days), depending on the formulation. Note: Dosages are not necessarily equivalent. Sources: See template.

=== Available forms ===
Estradiol benzoate is and has been available as an oil solution for intramuscular injection provided as vials and ampoules at concentrations of 0.167, 0.2, 0.33, 1, 1.67, 2, 5, 10, 20, and 25 mg/mL. It is also available as a microcrystalline aqueous suspension for intramuscular injection under the brand name Agofollin Depot. Sistocyclin was the brand name of a product containing 10 mg microcrystalline estradiol benzoate and 200 mg microcrystalline progesterone in an aqueous suspension. Follivirin (and previously Femandren M) is the brand name of a product containing 2.5 mg microcrystalline estradiol benzoate and 25 to 50 mg microcrystalline testosterone isobutyrate in aqueous suspension.

A vaginal tablet formulation containing 0.125 mg estradiol benzoate and 10 mg monalazone sodium (a vaginal disinfectant and spermicidal contraceptive) has been marketed under the brand name Malun 25. Estradiol benzoate was also formerly available as 50 and 100 mg pellets for subcutaneous implantation and as a 2 mg/g ointment.

Available forms of estradiol (Note: This table includes primarily products available as a single-ingredient estradiol preparation—thus excluding compounds with progestogens or other ingredients included. The table furthermore does not include compounded drugs—only commercially produced products. Availability of each product varies by country.)
Route	Ingredient	Form	Dose (Note: Doses are given per unit (ex: per tablet, per mL).)	Brand names (Note: Other brand names may be manufactured or previously manufactured.)
Oral	Estradiol	Tablet	0.1, 0.2, 0.5, 1, 2, 4 mg	Estrace, Ovocyclin
Oral	Estradiol valerate	Tablet	0.5, 1, 2, 4 mg	Progynova
Transdermal	Estradiol	Patch	14, 25, 37.5, 50, 60, 75, 100 µg/d	Climara, Vivelle
Transdermal	Estradiol	Gel pump	0.06% (0.52, 0.75 mg/pump)	Elestrin, EstroGel
Transdermal	Estradiol	Gel packet	0.1% (0.25, 0.5, 1.0 mg/pk.)	DiviGel, Sandrena
Transdermal	Estradiol	Emulsion	0.25% (25 µg/pouch)	Estrasorb
Transdermal	Estradiol	Spray	1.53 mg/spray	Evamist, Lenzetto
Vaginal	Estradiol	Tablet	10, 25 µg	Vagifem
Vaginal	Estradiol	Cream	0.01% (0.1 mg/gram)	Estrace
Vaginal	Estradiol	Insert	4, 10 µg	Imvexxy
Vaginal	Estradiol	Ring	2 mg/ring (7.5 µg/d, 3 mon.)	Estring
Vaginal	Estradiol acetate	Ring	50, 100 µg/d, 3 months	Femring
Injection (Note: By intramuscular or subcutaneous injection.)	Estradiol	Microspheres	1 mg/mL	Juvenum E
Injection	Estradiol benzoate	Oil solution	0.167, 0.2, 0.333, 1, 1.67, 2, 5, 10, 20, 25 mg/mL	Progynon-B
Injection	Estradiol cypionate	Oil solution	1, 3, 5 mg/mL	Depo-Estradiol
Injection	Estradiol valerate	Oil solution	5, 10, 20, 40 mg/mL	Progynon Depot
Implant	Estradiol	Pellet	20, 25, 50, 100 mg, 6 mon.	Estradiol Implants
Notes and sources: Sources:

== Contraindications ==
Contraindications of estrogens include coagulation problems, cardiovascular diseases, liver disease, and certain hormone-sensitive cancers such as breast cancer and endometrial cancer, among others.

== Side effects ==
The side effects of estradiol benzoate are the same as those of estradiol. Examples of such side effects include breast tenderness and enlargement, nausea, bloating, edema, headache, and melasma.

== Overdose ==
Symptoms of estrogen overdosage may include nausea, vomiting, bloating, increased weight, water retention, breast tenderness, vaginal discharge, heavy legs, and leg cramps. These side effects can be diminished by reducing the estrogen dosage.

== Interactions ==
Inhibitors and inducers of cytochrome P450 may influence the metabolism of estradiol and by extension circulating estradiol levels.

== Pharmacology ==
Estradiol, the active form of estradiol benzoate.

=== Pharmacodynamics ===
Estradiol benzoate is an estradiol ester, or a prodrug of estradiol. As such, it is an estrogen, or an agonist of the estrogen receptors. Estradiol benzoate has very low affinity for the ERs, on the order of 100-fold less than that of estradiol. As such, estradiol benzoate is regarded as essentially inactive in terms of estrogenic effect itself, acting solely as a prodrug to estradiol. Estradiol benzoate is of about 38% higher molecular weight than estradiol due to the presence of its C3 benzoate ester. Because estradiol benzoate is a prodrug of estradiol, it is considered to be a natural and bioidentical form of estrogen.

Affinities and estrogenic potencies of estrogen esters and ethers at the estrogen receptors
Estrogen	Other names	RBA (%)^{a}	REP (%)^{b}	
Estrogen	Other names	ER	ERα	ERβ
Estradiol	E2	100	100	100
Estradiol 3-sulfate	E2S; E2-3S	?	0.02	0.04
Estradiol 3-glucuronide	E2-3G	?	0.02	0.09
Estradiol 17β-glucuronide	E2-17G	?	0.002	0.0002
Estradiol benzoate	EB; Estradiol 3-benzoate	10	1.1	0.52
Estradiol 17β-acetate	E2-17A	31–45	24	?
Estradiol diacetate	EDA; Estradiol 3,17β-diacetate	?	0.79	?
Estradiol propionate	EP; Estradiol 17β-propionate	19–26	2.6	?
Estradiol valerate	EV; Estradiol 17β-valerate	2–11	0.04–21	?
Estradiol cypionate	EC; Estradiol 17β-cypionate	?^{c}	4.0	?
Estradiol palmitate	Estradiol 17β-palmitate	0	?	?
Estradiol stearate	Estradiol 17β-stearate	0	?	?
Estrone	E1; 17-Ketoestradiol	11	5.3–38	14
Estrone sulfate	E1S; Estrone 3-sulfate	2	0.004	0.002
Estrone glucuronide	E1G; Estrone 3-glucuronide	?	<0.001	0.0006
Ethinylestradiol	EE; 17α-Ethynylestradiol	100	17–150	129
Mestranol	EE 3-methyl ether	1	1.3–8.2	0.16
Quinestrol	EE 3-cyclopentyl ether	?	0.37	?
Footnotes: ^{a} = Relative binding affinities (RBAs) were determined via in-vitro displacement of labeled estradiol from estrogen receptors (ERs) generally of rodent uterine cytosol. Estrogen esters are variably hydrolyzed into estrogens in these systems (shorter ester chain length -> greater rate of hydrolysis) and the ER RBAs of the esters decrease strongly when hydrolysis is prevented. ^{b} = Relative estrogenic potencies (REPs) were calculated from half-maximal effective concentrations (EC_{50}) that were determined via in-vitro β‐galactosidase (β-gal) and green fluorescent protein (GFP) production assays in yeast expressing human ERα and human ERβ. Both mammalian cells and yeast have the capacity to hydrolyze estrogen esters. ^{c} = The affinities of estradiol cypionate for the ERs are similar to those of estradiol valerate and estradiol benzoate (figure). Sources: See template page.

==== Estrogenic potency ====
In the case of intramuscular injections of either estradiol benzoate or estradiol valerate in oil solution, the maturation dosage for the vaginal epithelium is 5 to 7 mg once per week and the endometrial proliferation dosage is 7 to 10 mg once per week. The total endometrial proliferation dosage of estradiol benzoate in oil solution by intramuscular injection over 14 days is 25 to 35 mg.

The full endometrial transformation dosage of estradiol benzoate/progesterone in oil solution is 1 to 2 mg estradiol benzoate and 20 to 25 mg progesterone by intramuscular injection daily for 10 to 14 days, whereas the full endometrial transformation dosage of estradiol benzoate/progesterone in microcrystalline aqueous suspension is a single intramuscular injection of 10 mg estradiol benzoate and 200 mg progesterone. For comparison, the full endometrial transformation dosage of estradiol valerate and hydroxyprogesterone caproate in oil solution (brand name Gravibinon) is a single intramuscular injection of 10 mg estradiol valerate and 250 to 375 mg hydroxyprogesterone caproate. Endometrial transformation normally occurs during the luteal phase of the menstrual cycle; it is induced by endogenous progesterone following adequate priming by endogenous estradiol.

The decidua (pregnancy-type endometrium) induction dosage of estradiol benzoate/progesterone in oil solution is 2 to 5 mg estradiol benzoate and 20 to 100 mg progesterone by intramuscular injection daily for 5 to 7 weeks, whereas the decidua induction dosage of estradiol benzoate/progesterone in microcrystalline aqueous suspension is 10 to 20 mg estradiol benzoate and 200 to 250 mg progesterone in microcrystalline aqueous suspension by intramuscular injection once per week for about 6 weeks. For comparison, the decidua induction dosage of estradiol valerate and hydroxyprogesterone caproate in oil solution is about the same as that of microcrystalline estradiol benzoate/progesterone in aqueous suspension. The decidua induction dosages of estrogen and progestogen combinations are pseudopregnancy dosages.

Potencies and durations of natural estrogens by intramuscular injection
Estrogen	Form	Dose (mg)		Duration by dose (mg)
Estrogen	Form	EPD	CICD	Duration by dose (mg)
Estradiol	Aq. soln.	?	–	<1 d
Estradiol	Oil soln.	40–60	–	1–2 ≈ 1–2 d
Estradiol	Aq. susp.	?	3.5	0.5–2 ≈ 2–7 d; 3.5 ≈ >5 d
Estradiol	Microsph.	?	–	1 ≈ 30 d
Estradiol benzoate	Oil soln.	25–35	–	1.66 ≈ 2–3 d; 5 ≈ 3–6 d
Estradiol benzoate	Aq. susp.	20	–	10 ≈ 16–21 d
Estradiol benzoate	Emulsion	?	–	10 ≈ 14–21 d
Estradiol dipropionate	Oil soln.	25–30	–	5 ≈ 5–8 d
Estradiol valerate	Oil soln.	20–30	5	5 ≈ 7–8 d; 10 ≈ 10–14 d; 40 ≈ 14–21 d; 100 ≈ 21–28 d
Estradiol benz. butyrate	Oil soln.	?	10	10 ≈ 21 d
Estradiol cypionate	Oil soln.	20–30	–	5 ≈ 11–14 d
Estradiol cypionate	Aq. susp.	?	5	5 ≈ 14–24 d
Estradiol enanthate	Oil soln.	?	5–10	10 ≈ 20–30 d
Estradiol dienanthate	Oil soln.	?	–	7.5 ≈ >40 d
Estradiol undecylate	Oil soln.	?	–	10–20 ≈ 40–60 d; 25–50 ≈ 60–120 d
Polyestradiol phosphate	Aq. soln.	40–60	–	40 ≈ 30 d; 80 ≈ 60 d; 160 ≈ 120 d
Estrone	Oil soln.	?	–	1–2 ≈ 2–3 d
Estrone	Aq. susp.	?	–	0.1–2 ≈ 2–7 d
Estriol	Oil soln.	?	–	1–2 ≈ 1–4 d
Polyestriol phosphate	Aq. soln.	?	–	50 ≈ 30 d; 80 ≈ 60 d
Notes and sources Notes: All aqueous suspensions are of microcrystalline particle size. Estradiol production during the menstrual cycle is 30–640 µg/d (6.4–8.6 mg total per month or cycle). The vaginal epithelium maturation dosage of estradiol benzoate or estradiol valerate has been reported as 5 to 7 mg/week. An effective ovulation-inhibiting dose of estradiol undecylate is 20–30 mg/month. Sources: See template.

==== Antigonadotropic effects ====
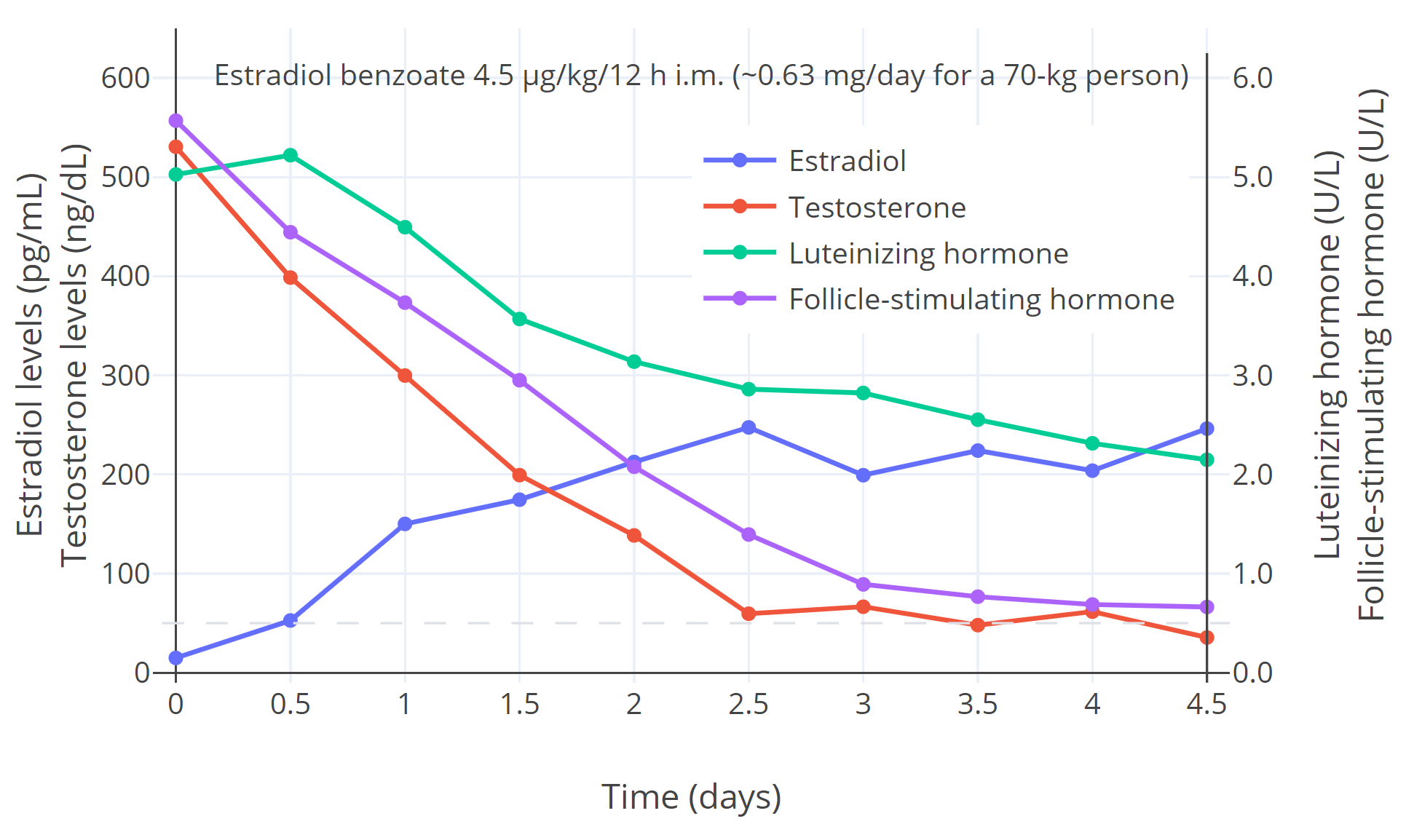
Levels of estradiol, testosterone, and gonadotropins with 4.5 μg/kg injectable estradiol benzoate every 12 hours (or ~0.63 mg/day for a 70-kg [154-lb] person) in transgender women.

As with other estrogens and forms of estradiol, estradiol benzoate dose-dependently suppresses gonadotropin and testosterone levels in men and transgender women. In a study that administered estradiol benzoate twice-daily to transgender women at a dose that resulted in measured estradiol levels of about 200 to 250 pg/mL, testosterone levels decreased from around 530 ng/dL at baseline to about 55 ng/dL (–90%) within approximately 3 days of treatment.

=== Pharmacokinetics ===
Following administration, estradiol benzoate acts as a prodrug of estradiol via cleavage by esterases into estradiol and the natural fatty acid benzoic acid. This cleavage occurs not only in the liver, but also in the blood and in tissues. Esters of estradiol like estradiol benzoate are readily hydrolyzed to estradiol, but have an extended duration when administered in via intramuscular or subcutaneous injection due to a depot effect afforded by their fatty acid ester moiety and consequent high lipophilicity. A long-lasting local tissue depot is formed by the injection that slowly releases estradiol benzoate into the circulation.

==== Intramuscular injection ====
===== Oil solution =====
The duration of action of estradiol benzoate in oil solution by intramuscular injection at typical clinical doses (e.g., 0.33–1.66 mg) is said to be 2 to 3 days. A single dose of 2.5 mg estradiol benzoate in oil solution by intramuscular injection was found to produce plasma estradiol levels of greater than 400 pg/mL, measured 24 hours post-injection, in a group of patients with minimal baseline levels of estradiol (due to GnRH analogue therapy with triptorelin). The elimination half-life of estradiol benzoate in oil solution by intramuscular injection has been reported to be 48 to 120 hours (2 to 5 days).

A single intramuscular injection of 5 mg estradiol benzoate in oil solution has been found to result in peak circulating concentrations of 940 pg/mL estradiol and 343 pg/mL estrone, which occurred at about 2 days post-injection. Compared to two other commonly used estradiol esters, estradiol benzoate had the shortest duration, at approximately 4 to 5 days, whereas estradiol valerate and estradiol cypionate were found to last for 7 to 8 days and 11 days, respectively. This is because estradiol benzoate has a shorter and less bulky fatty acid chain, and in relation to this, is comparatively less lipophilic. For a given estradiol ester, the shorter or less bulky the fatty acid chain is, the less lipophilic, shorter-lasting, and less uniform/plateau-like the resultant levels of estradiol are as well as the higher (and hence more spike-like) the peak/maximal levels are.

Daily intramuscular injections of 1 mg estradiol benzoate in oil solution have been found to produce estradiol excretion rates almost double those of the normal luteal phase. This is in accordance with known production rates of estradiol in women (e.g., 300 μg/day in the luteal phase).

Hormone levels with estradiol benzoate by intramuscular injection
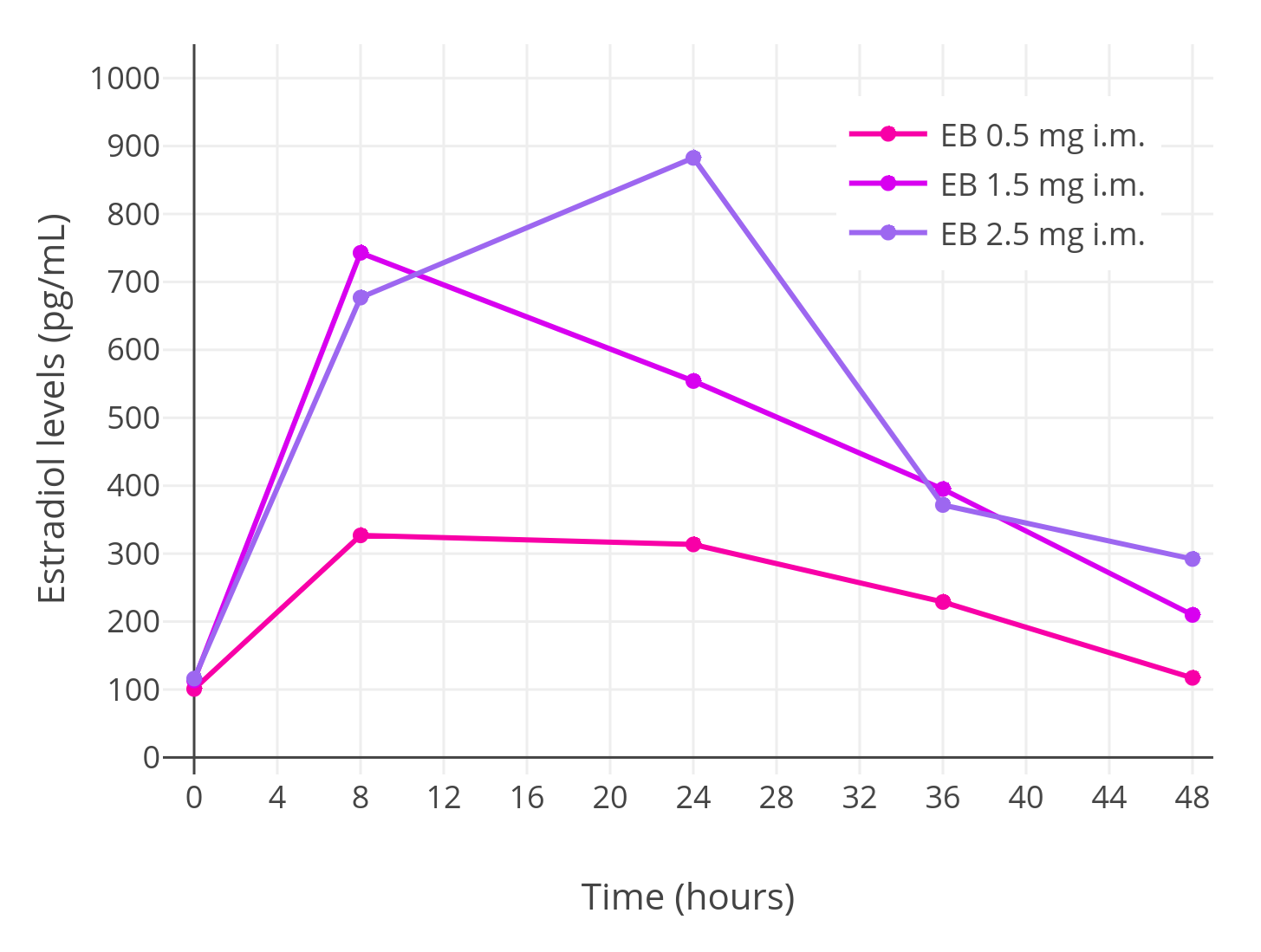
Estradiol levels after single intramuscular injections of 0.5, 1.5, or 2.5 mg estradiol benzoate in oil in 5 premenopausal women each. Assays were performed using radioimmunoassay. Source was Shaw et al. (1975).

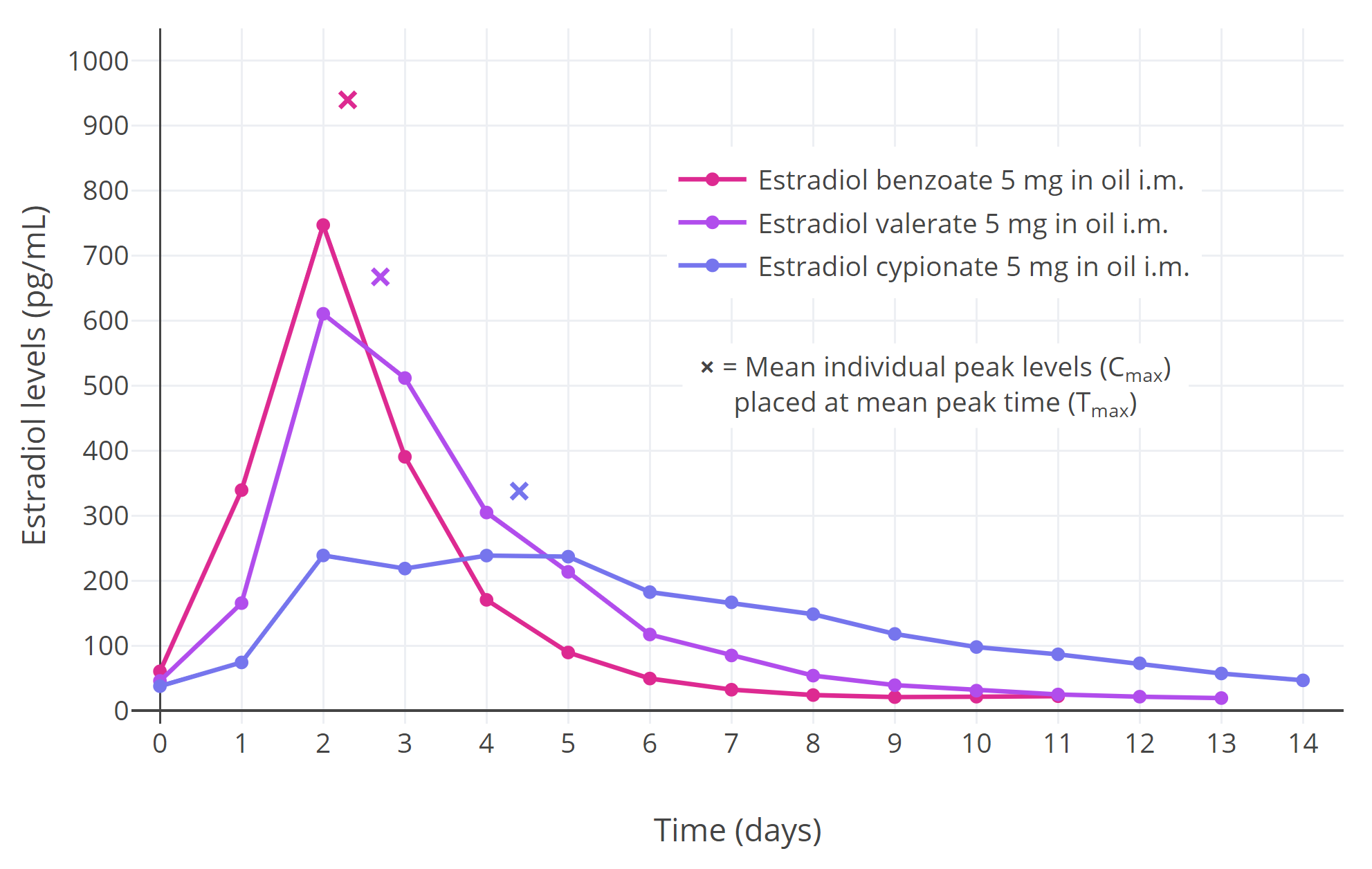
Estradiol levels after single intramuscular injections of 5 mg of different estradiol esters in oil in about 10 premenopausal women each. Assays were performed using radioimmunoassay with chromatographic separation. Source was Oriowo et al. (1980).

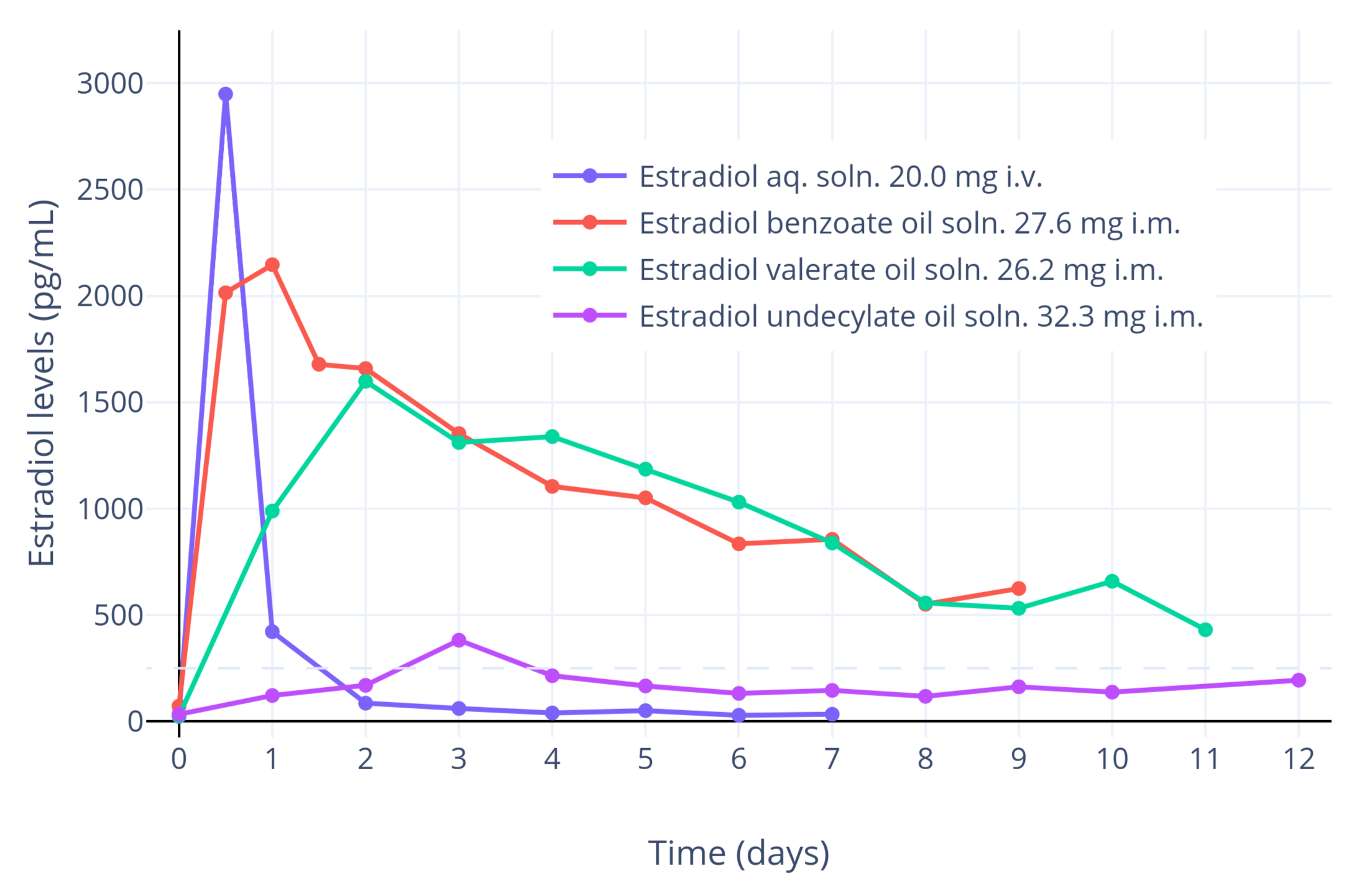
Estradiol levels after a short intravenous infusion of 20 mg estradiol in aqueous solution or an intramuscular injection of equimolar doses of estradiol esters in oil solution in postmenopausal women. Assays were performed using RIA with CS. Source was Geppert (1975).

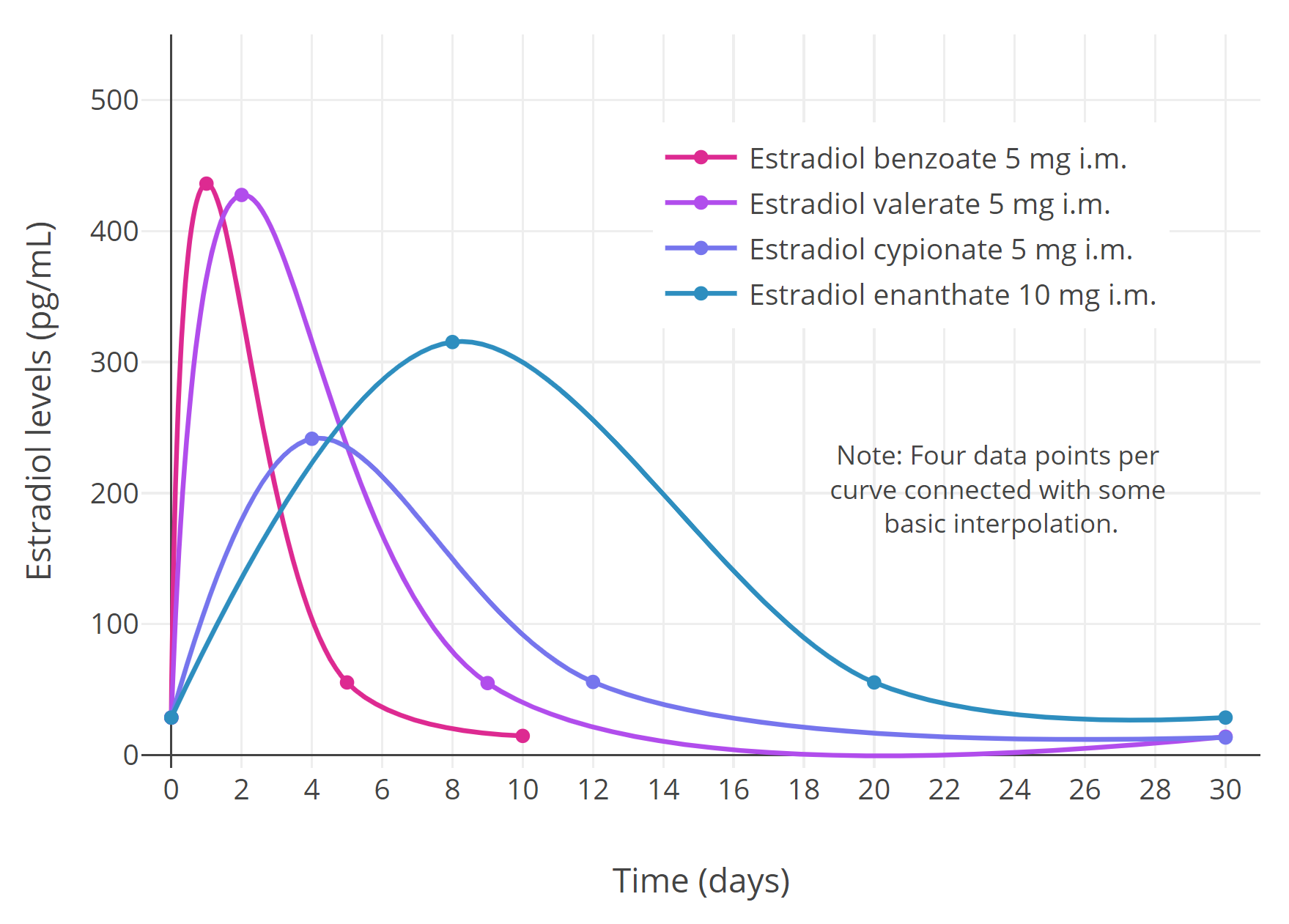
Simplified curves of estradiol levels after injection of different estradiol esters in women. Source was Garza-Flores (1994).

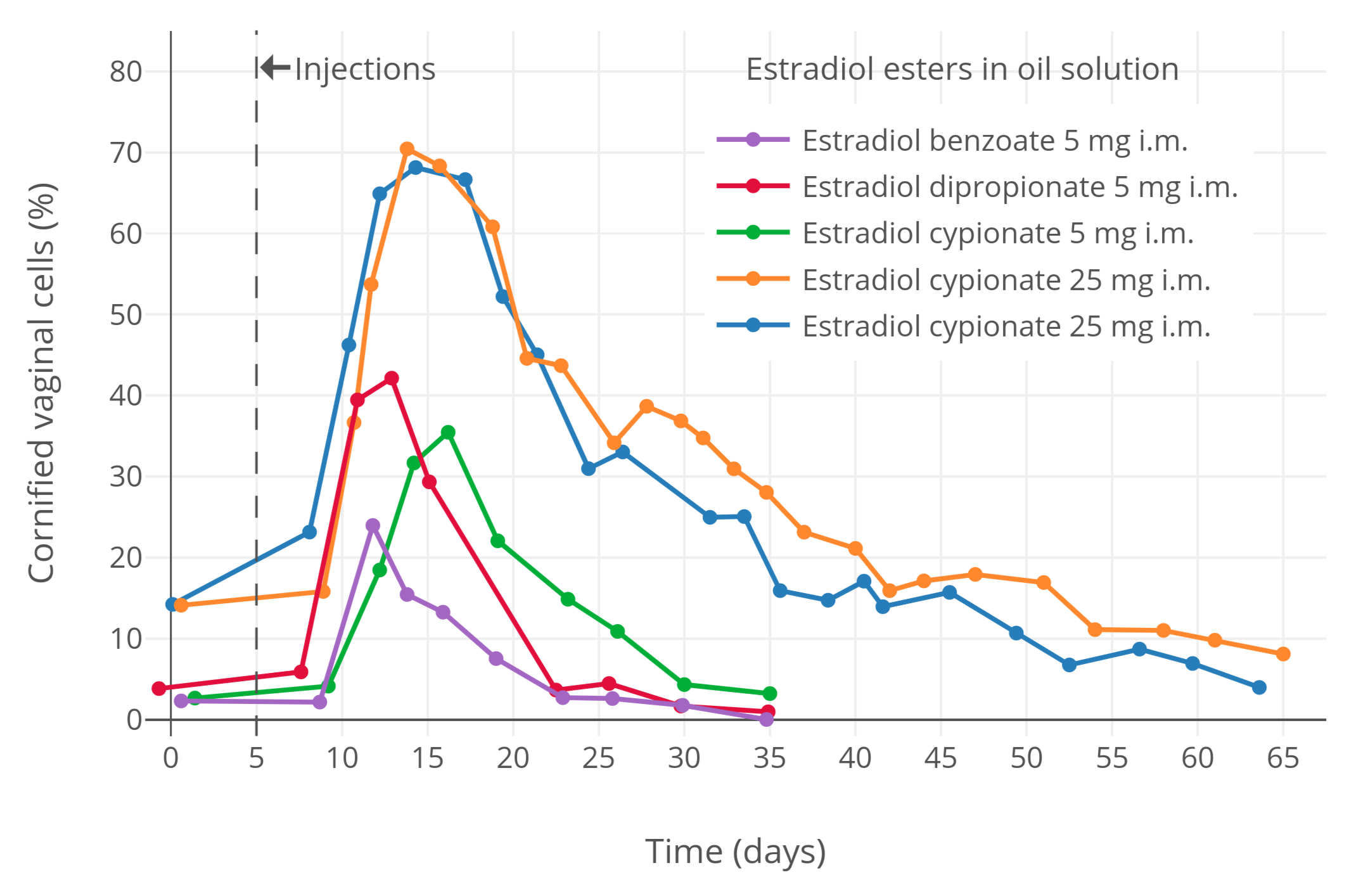
Vaginal cornification with a single intramuscular injection of different estradiol esters in oil solution in women. Source was Schwartz & Soule (1955).

===== Aqueous suspension =====
Microcrystalline estradiol benzoate in aqueous suspension (brand names Agofollin Depot and Ovocyclin M alone and Follivirin in combination with testosterone isobutyrate) has been found to have a longer duration of action than amorphous estradiol benzoate in oil solution when administered via intramuscular injection. Whereas the duration of a single intramuscular injection of estradiol benzoate in oil solution is 6 days, the duration of a single intramuscular injection of microcrystalline estradiol benzoate in aqueous suspension is 16 to 21 days. Its duration also surpasses that of estradiol valerate and estradiol cypionate. The duration of microcrystalline aqueous suspensions administered by intramuscular injection is dependent both on concentration and on crystal size.

==== Other routes ====
The duration of estradiol benzoate is not prolonged if it is administered directly into the circulation via intravenous injection, in contrast to intramuscular injection.

Estradiol benzoate is active with oral and sublingual administration, similarly to estradiol valerate and estradiol acetate. However, it is not marketed in any formulation for use by these routes. Oral estradiol benzoate has been reported to possess about one-third to half the potency of intramuscular injection of estradiol benzoate. This level of oral potency has been described as remarkably high. The sublingual potency of estradiol benzoate is similar to that of estradiol. A study found that the total dose of estradiol benzoate needed for endometrial proliferation in women was 60 to 140 mg, relative to 60 to 180 mg for estradiol. Both estradiol and estradiol benzoate has a persistence of estrogenic effect with single administration of one day.

Subcutaneous implantation of crystalline estradiol benzoate pellets has been studied, but no estradiol benzoate pellet implants have been marketed.

== Chemistry ==
Estradiol benzoate is a synthetic estrane steroid and the C3 benzoate (benzenecarboxylate) ester of estradiol. It is also known as estradiol 3-benzoate or as estra-1,3,5(10)-triene-3,17β-diol 3-benzoate. Two estradiol esters that are related to estradiol benzoate are estradiol dipropionate, the C3,17β dipropionate ester of estradiol, and estradiol acetate, the C3 acetate ester of estradiol.

The experimental octanol/water partition coefficient (logP) of estradiol benzoate is 4.7.

Structural properties of selected estradiol esters
Estrogen	Structure	Ester(s)				Relative mol. weight	Relative E2 content^{b}	log P^{c}
Estrogen	Structure	Position(s)	Moiet(ies)	Type	Length^{a}	Relative mol. weight	Relative E2 content^{b}	log P^{c}
Estradiol		–	–	–	–	1.00	1.00	4.0
Estradiol acetate		C3	Ethanoic acid	Straight-chain fatty acid	2	1.15	0.87	4.2
Estradiol benzoate		C3	Benzoic acid	Aromatic fatty acid	– (~4–5)	1.38	0.72	4.7
Estradiol dipropionate		C3, C17β	Propanoic acid (×2)	Straight-chain fatty acid	3 (×2)	1.41	0.71	4.9
Estradiol valerate		C17β	Pentanoic acid	Straight-chain fatty acid	5	1.31	0.76	5.6–6.3
Estradiol benzoate butyrate		C3, C17β	Benzoic acid, butyric acid	Mixed fatty acid	– (~6, 2)	1.64	0.61	6.3
Estradiol cypionate		C17β	Cyclopentylpropanoic acid	Cyclic fatty acid	– (~6)	1.46	0.69	6.9
Estradiol enanthate		C17β	Heptanoic acid	Straight-chain fatty acid	7	1.41	0.71	6.7–7.3
Estradiol dienanthate		C3, C17β	Heptanoic acid (×2)	Straight-chain fatty acid	7 (×2)	1.82	0.55	8.1–10.4
Estradiol undecylate		C17β	Undecanoic acid	Straight-chain fatty acid	11	1.62	0.62	9.2–9.8
Estradiol stearate		C17β	Octadecanoic acid	Straight-chain fatty acid	18	1.98	0.51	12.2–12.4
Estradiol distearate		C3, C17β	Octadecanoic acid (×2)	Straight-chain fatty acid	18 (×2)	2.96	0.34	20.2
Estradiol sulfate		C3	Sulfuric acid	Water-soluble conjugate	–	1.29	0.77	0.3–3.8
Estradiol glucuronide		C17β	Glucuronic acid	Water-soluble conjugate	–	1.65	0.61	2.1–2.7
Estramustine phosphate^{d}		C3, C17β	Normustine, phosphoric acid	Water-soluble conjugate	–	1.91	0.52	2.9–5.0
Polyestradiol phosphate^{e}		C3–C17β	Phosphoric acid	Water-soluble conjugate	–	1.23^{f}	0.81^{f}	2.9^{g}
Footnotes: ^{a} = Length of ester in carbon atoms for straight-chain fatty acids or approximate length of ester in carbon atoms for aromatic or cyclic fatty acids. ^{b} = Relative estradiol content by weight (i.e., relative estrogenic exposure). ^{c} = Experimental or predicted octanol/water partition coefficient (i.e., lipophilicity/hydrophobicity). Retrieved from PubChem, ChemSpider, and DrugBank. ^{d} = Also known as estradiol normustine phosphate. ^{e} = Polymer of estradiol phosphate (~13 repeat units). ^{f} = Relative molecular weight or estradiol content per repeat unit. ^{g} = log P of repeat unit (i.e., estradiol phosphate). Sources: See individual articles.

== History ==
Estradiol benzoate was one of the first estrogens to be developed and marketed. In 1932, Adolf Butenandt described estrone benzoate and reported that it had a prolonged duration of action. Schwenk and Hildebrant at Schering discovered estradiol via reduction of estrone in 1933, and they proceeded to synthesize estradiol benzoate from estradiol the same year. Estradiol benzoate was patented by Schering in 1933 and was introduced in an oil solution for use by intramuscular injection under the brand name Progynon B that year as well. By 1936, multiple formulations of estradiol benzoate in oil solution had been marketed, including under the brand names Progynon B by Schering, Dimenformon Benzoate by Roche-Organon, and Oestroform B by British Drug Houses. By the early 1940s, Ben-Ovocylin had been introduced by Ciba as well. In the late 1940s, the brand name Ben-Ovocylin was changed by Ciba to Ovocylin Benzoate. Following their introduction, estradiol benzoate and estradiol dipropionate were the most widely used esters of estradiol for many years. However, estradiol valerate and estradiol cypionate, which are longer-acting esters that require less frequent administration, were developed and introduced in the 1950s, and have since largely superseded estradiol benzoate and estradiol dipropionate.

== Society and culture ==
=== Generic names ===
Estradiol benzoate is the generic name of the drug and its INN, BANM, and JAN, while oestradiol benzoate was formerly its BANM.

=== Brand names ===
The major brand name of estradiol benzoate is Progynon-B. It has also been sold under a variety of other brand names including Agofollin Depot, Ben-Ovocylin, Benzhormovarine, Benzoestrofol, Benzofoline, Benzo-Ginestryl, Benzo-Ginoestril, Benzo-Gynoestryl, Benzoate d'oestradiol P.A. Intervet, Benztrone, Benztrone Pabyrn, Diffollisterol, Di-Folliculine, Dimenformon, Dimenformon Benzoate, Dimenformone, Diogyn B, EBZ, Eston-B, Estradiolo Amsa, Femestrone, Follicormon, Follidrin, Graafina, Gynecormone, Gynecormone Gouttes, Gynformone, Metroval, Hidroestron, Hormogynon, Oestradiol Benzoat, Oestradiol-Benzoat Intervet, Oestradiol-K Streuli, Oestradiolium Benzoicum, Oestraform, Ostrin, Ovahormon Benzoate, Ovasterol-B, Ovex, Ovocyclin Benzoate, Ovocyclin M, Primogyn B, Primogyn B Oleosum, Primogyn I, Progynon Benzoate, Recthormone, Oestradiol, Reglovar, Solestro, and Unistradiol, among others.

=== Availability ===
Estradiol benzoate is available in Europe and in other parts of the world. It was previously available for medical use in the United States, but is no longer marketed in this country. However, it is approved and marketed in the United States for veterinary use as a subdermal implant both alone and in combination with the androgen/anabolic steroid trenbolone acetate (brand names Celerin and Synovex, respectively). Outside of the United States, estradiol benzoate is also marketed in combination with progesterone for use as an intramuscular injection.

Microcrystalline estradiol benzoate in aqueous suspension is available in the Czech Republic and Slovakia alone under the brand name Agofollin Depot and in combination with microcrystalline testosterone isobutyrate under the brand name Folivirin.

== Research ==
Estradiol benzoate has been studied in combination with norethisterone enanthate as a once-a-month combined injectable contraceptive, but ultimately did not complete development for this indication.
