= Ampoule =

Hermetically sealed glass vial

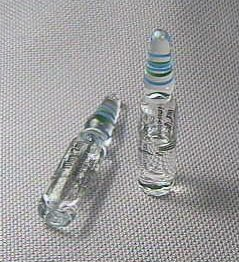
Ampoules containing pharmaceutical products

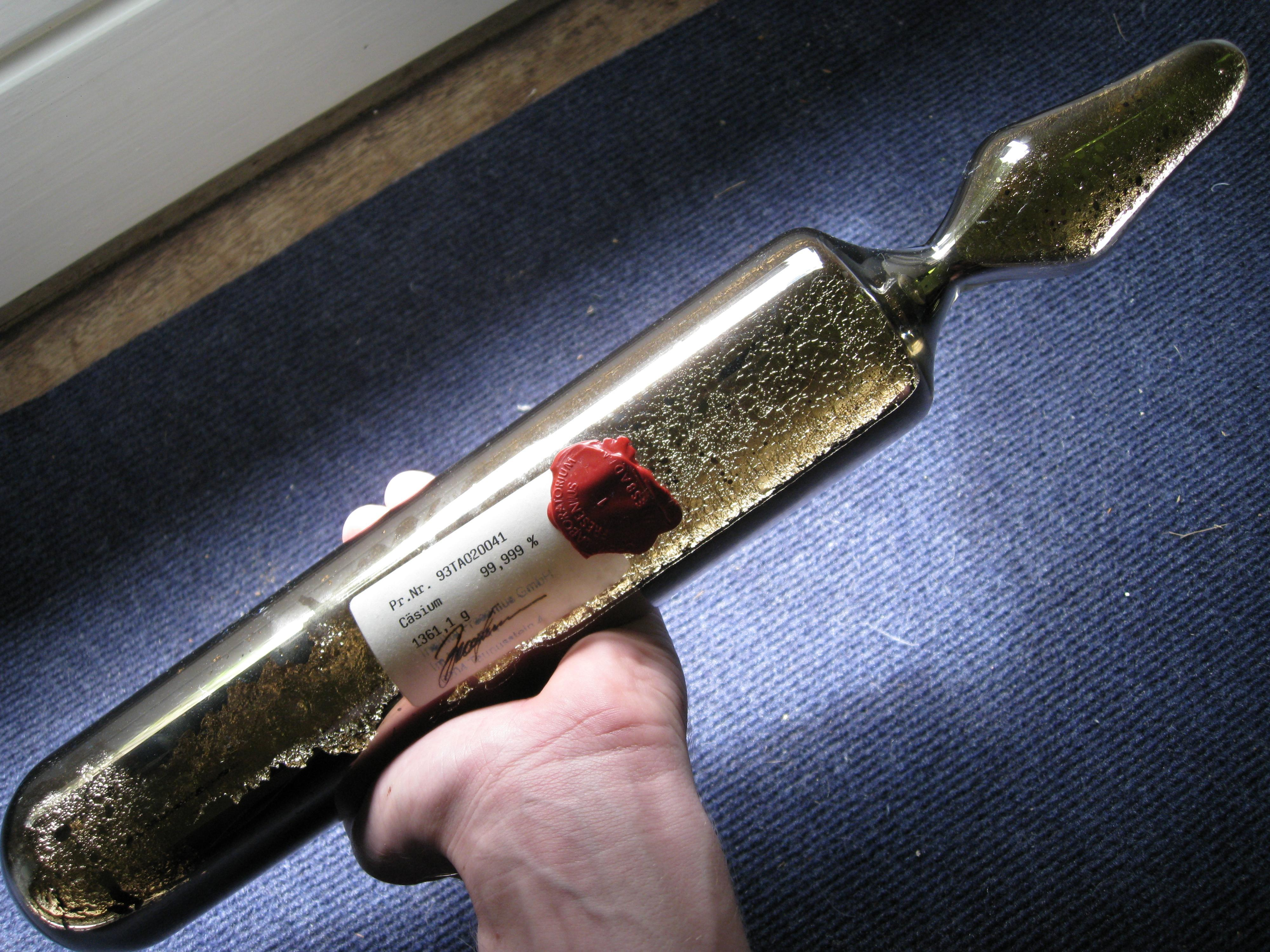
A large ampoule containing 1.4 kg (3.1 lb) of high-purity caesium

An ampoule (also ampul and ampule) is a small sealed vial used to contain and preserve a sample, usually a solid or liquid. Ampoules are usually made of glass.

Modern ampoules are most commonly used for pharmaceuticals and chemicals that must be protected from air and contaminants. They are hermetically sealed by melting the thin top with an open flame, and usually opened by snapping off the neck. The space above the chemical may be filled with an inert gas before sealing. The walls of glass ampoules are usually sufficiently strong to be brought into a glovebox without any difficulty.

Glass ampoules are more expensive than bottles and other simple containers, but there are many situations where their superior imperviousness to gases and liquids and all-glass interior surface justifies the cost. Examples of chemicals sold in ampoules are injectable pharmaceuticals, air-sensitive reagents like tetrakis(triphenylphosphine)palladium(0), hygroscopic materials like deuterated solvents and trifluoromethanesulfonic acid, and analytical standards.

== Early history ==
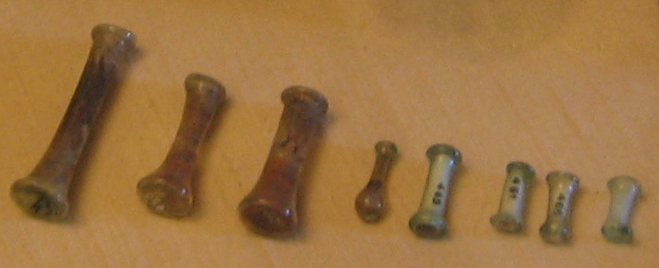
A collection of ancient ampoules

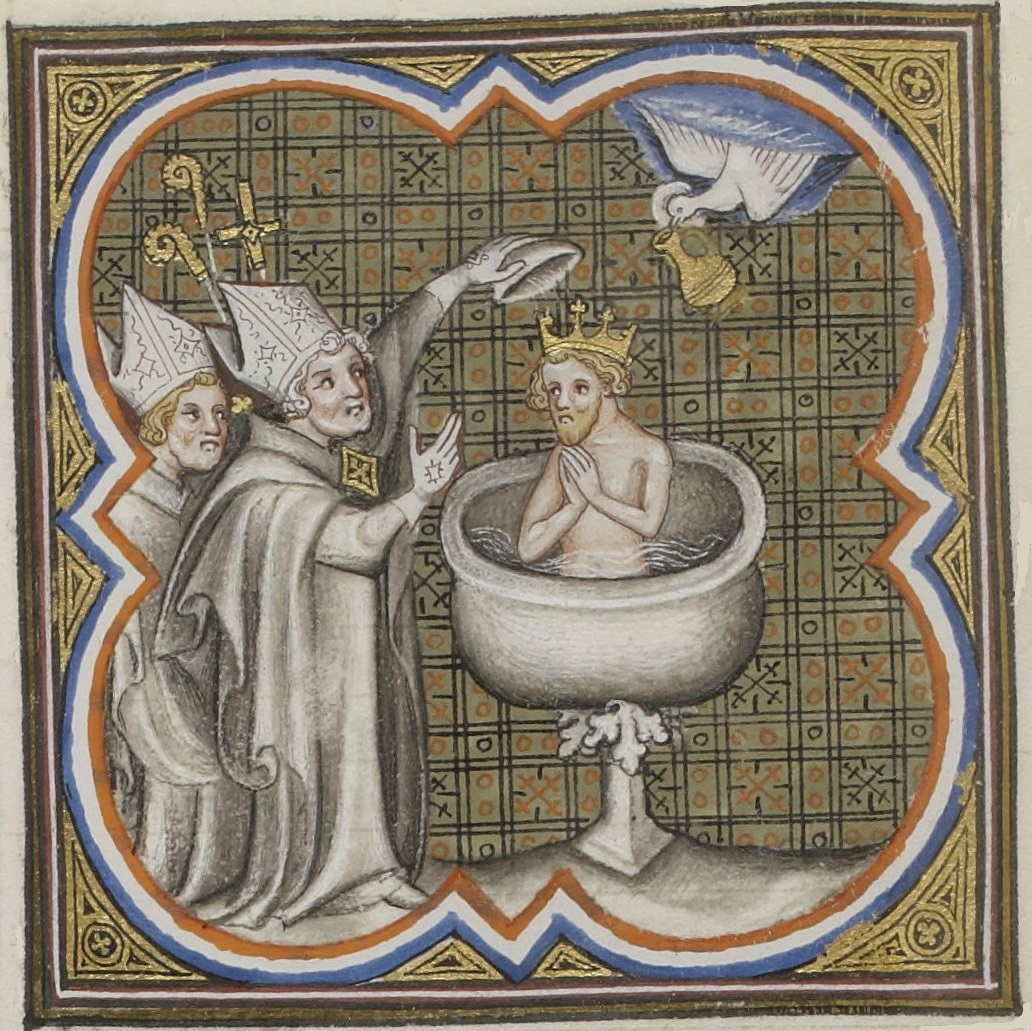
The Holy Ghost brings the Holy Ampulla for the baptism of Clovis I

Historically, ampoules were used to contain a small sample of a person's blood after death, which was entombed alongside them in many Christian catacombs. It was originally believed that only martyrs were given this burial treatment, but it is now suspected to have been widely practiced.

An ampoule allegedly dating to the year 305 and filled with the blood of Saint Januarius (San Gennaro), bishop of Benevento, has been kept for centuries in the Cathedral at Naples. Every year on 19 September the town celebrates the Feast of San Gennaro, when the solid reddish-brown contents of the ampoule usually liquifies after being taken out of a safe. It is then carried in procession and placed on the cathedral's altar.

Another well-known ampoule is the Holy Ampulla (Sainte Ampoule), which held the anointing oil for the coronation of French monarchs. The oil was allegedly passed down from the time of Clovis I; it was kept for a time in the tomb of Saint Remigius and later in the Cathedral of Notre-Dame, Reims. It was used at the coronation of Charles X in 1825.

== Production ==
Modern glass ampoules are produced industrially from short lengths of glass tubing, shaped by heating with gas torches and gravity in automated production lines. Computer vision techniques are usually employed for quality control.

The filling and sealing of ampoules may be done by automated machinery on an industrial scale, or by hand in small-scale industries and laboratory. Ampoule-filling machines can be categorized in three categories called automatic machine, semi automatic machine, and manual (hand-operated) machines. Blank ampoules can be purchased from scientific glass supply houses and sealed with a small gas torch. A Schlenk line may be used for sealing under inert atmospheres. This procedure usually involves nitrogen purging before and after filling liquid into ampoules in order to remove atmospheric air available inside the ampoules.

Ampoules can be pressurized, have air evacuated from them, and have the air in the ampoule replaced with other gasses, often inert ones. The radio-pharmaceutical Xenon-133 often is packaged in glass ampoules and specially-shaped glass ampoules have long been used for samples of gaseous elements, such as all of the noble gases save radon (mainly because it is radioactive with a half-life of less than half a week) and special thick-walled quartz and fluorite ampoules under high pressure containing fluorine and chlorine liquefied by the high pressure.

Teflon ampoules have been developed, based on the concept of the Teflon jug for high-molarity hydrofluoric acid, for containing chemicals that would corrode and/or ignite glass and/or contaminate themselves, corrode, or disintegrate metal containers where the reagent does not passivate the metal by rapidly forming a layer of a new inert compound on the metal surface reliably and predictably or at all.

Photosensitive chemicals like many 14-dihydromorphinone opioids like hydromorphone and oxymorphone, various silver salts and so on can be packaged in ampoules of smoked glass, glass with chemicals added in manufacturing that filter out ultraviolet and other types of light, or be made with an opaque top and bottom (usually painted with opaque paint) and the rest of the ampoule wrapped in thick paper.

== Usage ==
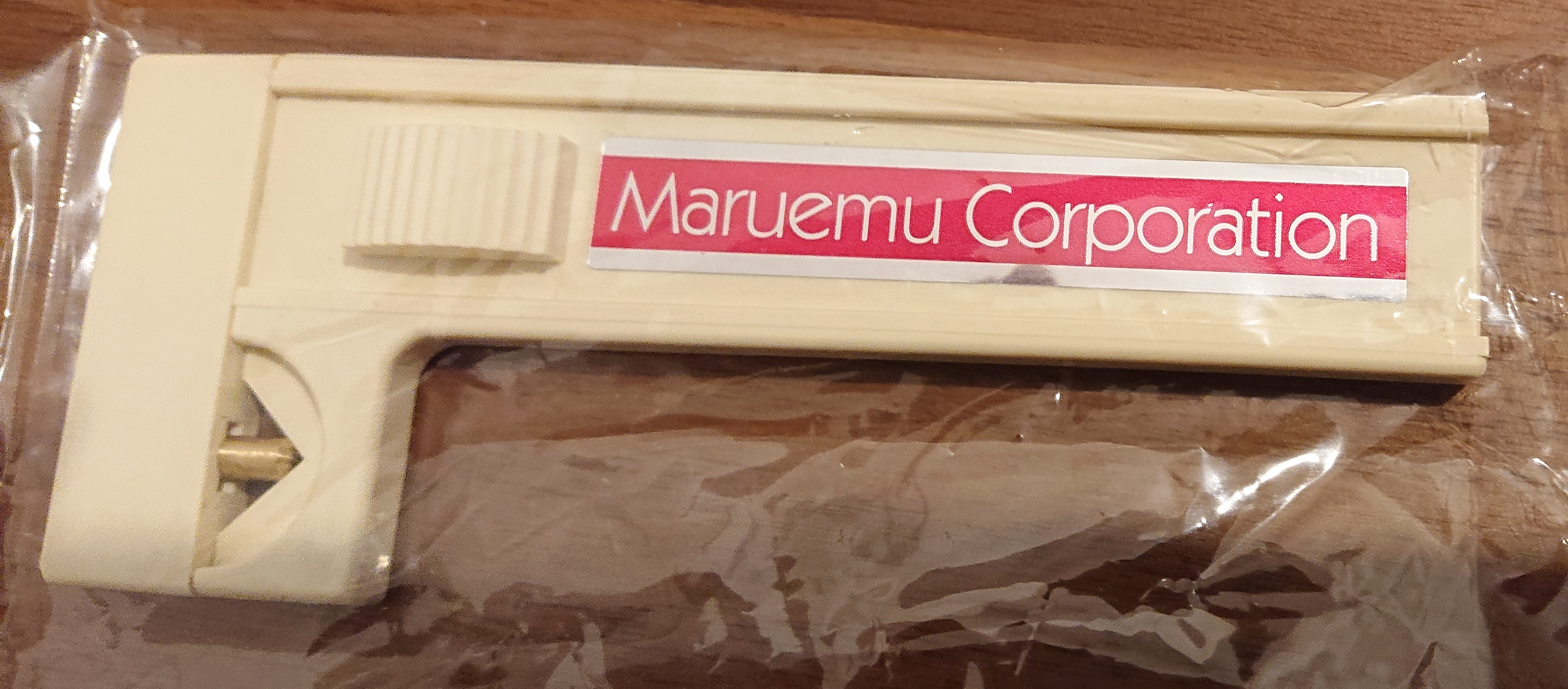
An ampoule cutter that cuts the neck to open the ampoule. Not required for a "one point cut" ampoule.

Ampoules are opened by scoring the neck and snapping the top off. In "one point cut" (OPC) ampoules, a dot above the neck marks the correct thumb placement that aligns the thumb with a pre-made micro-score in the ampoule. If properly done, this last operation creates a clean break without any extra glass shards or slivers, but the liquid or solution may be filtered for greater assurance.

Glass-particle contamination is of ongoing concern, with patients who receive medication parenterally, such as intravenously under hospital care, at greater risk of receiving glass particulates when medication is aspirated. A 2016 study of 180 ampoules found 19,473 glass particles in aspirated fluids, with filtering reducing the mean by only 114 to 89 particles per ampoule. Glass particle contamination of an ampule occurred with all intravenous injection methods.

== Standards ==
Diagram of an ampoule showing color-coded neck rings

The production and packaging of ampoules are largely standardized by ISO 9187-1:2010 Injection equipment for medical use — Part 1: Ampoules for injectables. This standard dictates three standardized forms: B, cut/straight-form; C, open-funnel; and D, sealed. (The "A" form is no longer used in the pharmaceutical industry and is not included in the updated version.) ISO 9187-1:2010 addresses what materials should be used in their manufacture, what the dimensions should be, what capacities they should have, how they should perform, and how they should be packaged. Characteristics such as breaking force, hydrolytic resistance, and annealing quality are specified for all three forms.

Ampoules often have colored rings of paint or enamel around their necks that are meant to identify the substance inside the ampoule. The rings are machine-readable and allow for accurate handling of the substance for the purposes of storage, labeling, and secondary packaging. Color coding of modern ampoules is done during the manufacturing process. A machine applies colored rings on the ampoule between the two ovens.

== Other uses ==
Ampoules are common practice as containers of low-frequency RFID tags. These are used mainly for tagging animals for identification.

== See also ==
- Ampulla – Small vessel used in ancient Rome
