= Concept Foundation =

Swiss-Thai foundation

The Concept Foundation is a non-profit foundation which was established by the UNDP/UNFPA/WHO/WB Special program in Reproductive Health (WHO/HRP), PATH, the World Bank in 1989 in Bangkok, Thailand, "as a mechanism through which WHO’s rights associated with an injectable contraceptive, Cyclofem, could be licensed to potential producers in developing countries". Estradiol cypionate/medroxyprogesterone acetate (brand names Cyclofem, Lunelle; code name Cyclo-Provera), is a once-a-month combined injectable contraceptive which contains 25 mg of medroxyprogesterone acetate—the same ingredient in Depo Provera—and 5 mg of estradiol cypionate.

Since its inception in 1989, more than 120 million doses of Cyclofem have been manufactured and sold worldwide. Concept Foundation products have been manufactured in 8 countries and are made available in more than 30 developing countries.

== Medabon ==
Medabon is another product developed by the Concept Foundation which induces medical abortion. Medabon combines mifepristone and misoprostol, two abortifacients which health organizations had already deemed safe and effective. Implementation and initial research of the Medabon regimen was done by PATH and Ipas.

== See also ==
- Special Programme on Human Reproduction
