= Estradiol cypionate/hydroxyprogesterone caproate =

Combination drug

Estradiol cypionate / hydroxyprogesterone caproate

- Estradiol cypionate (top) and hydroxyprogesterone caproate (bottom)

Combination of
- Estradiol cypionate: Estrogen
- Hydroxyprogesterone caproate: Progestogen

Clinical data
- Trade names: Sinbios
- Other names: EC/OHPC
- Routes of administration: Intramuscular injection

Estradiol cypionate/hydroxyprogesterone caproate (EC/OHPC), sold under the brand name Sinbios, is a combination medication of estradiol cypionate (EC), an estrogen, and hydroxyprogesterone caproate (OHPC), a progestin, which was reportedly used as a combined injectable contraceptive in women in the early 1970s. It contained 5 mg EC and 250 mg OHPC in oil solution, was provided in the form of 1 mL ampoules, and was administered by intramuscular injection at regular intervals. The medication was manufactured by the pharmaceutical company Mavi in Mexico.

== See also ==
- List of combined sex-hormonal preparations § Estrogens and progestogens
