= Estradiol valerate/norethisterone enantate =

Combination drug

Estradiol valerate / norethisterone enantate

- Estradiol valerate (top) and norethisterone enantate (bottom)

Combination of
- Estradiol valerate: Estrogen
- Norethisterone enantate: Progestogen

Clinical data
- Trade names: Mesigyna, others
- Other names: EV/NETE; HRP-102
- Routes of administration: Intramuscular injection

Identifiers
- CAS Number: 979-32-8; 3836-23-5
- PubChem CID: 115350
- UNII: OKG364O896; HY3S2K0J0F

Estradiol valerate/norethisterone enantate (EV/NETE), sold under the brand name Mesigyna among others, is a form of combined injectable birth control which is used to prevent pregnancy in women. It contains estradiol valerate (EV), an estrogen, and norethisterone enantate (NETE), a progestin. The medication is given once a month by injection into muscle.

EV/NETE is approved for use in at least 36 countries, and is the most widely used combined injectable contraceptive. It is available widely throughout Latin America, in a few Asian and African countries, and in Turkey.

== Medical uses ==
EV/NETE is used as a combined injectable contraceptive to prevent pregnancy in women. It is given by intramuscular injection once a month.

=== Available forms ===
EV/NETE is available in the form of an oil solution containing 5 mg estradiol valerate (EV) and 50 mg norethisterone enantate (NETE).

== Pharmacology ==
=== Pharmacodynamics ===
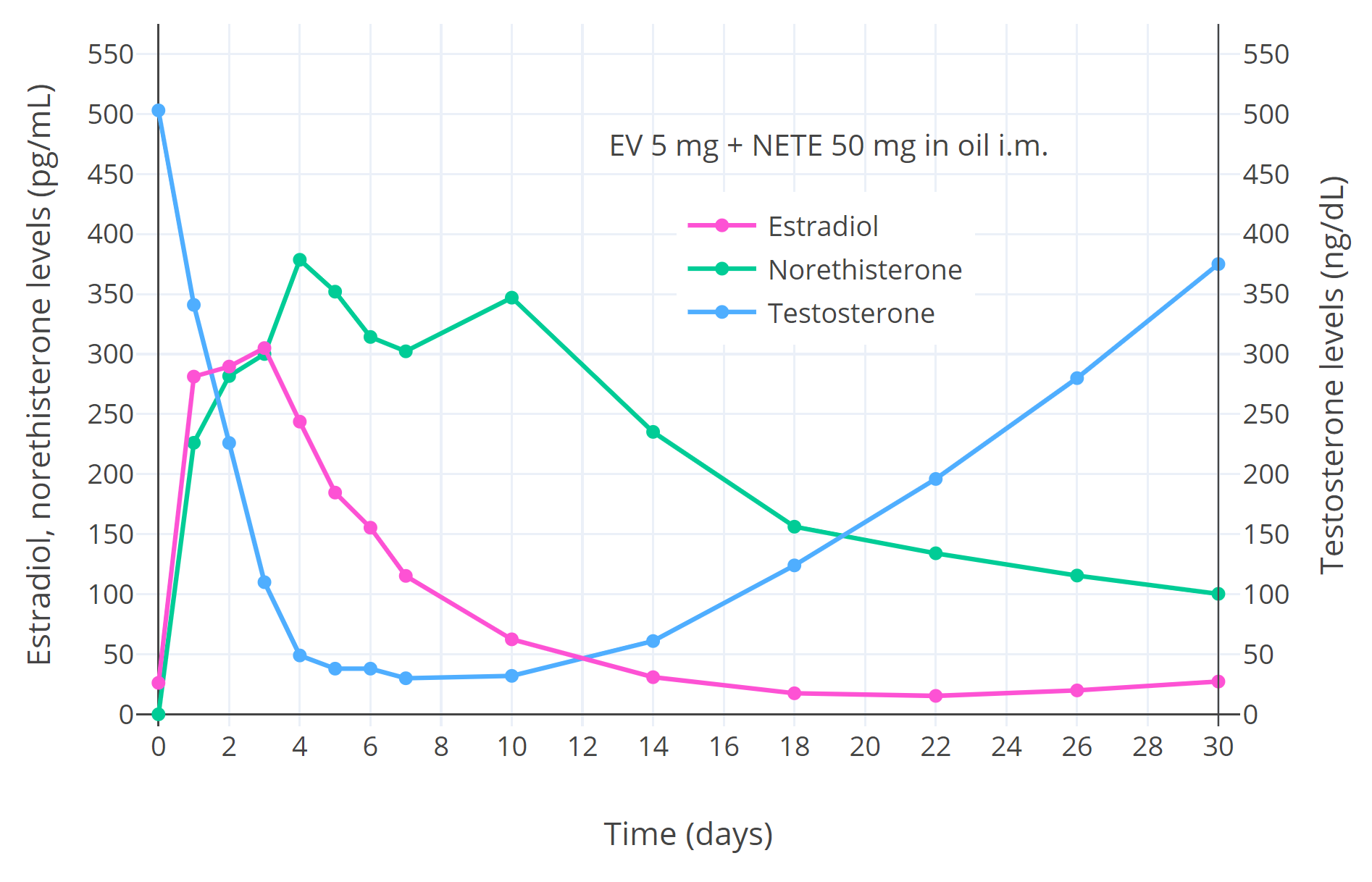
Hormone levels following a single intramuscular injection of EV/NETE (5 mg/50 mg) in healthy young men. Testosterone levels were maximally suppressed by about 94%, to ~30 ng/dL, when measured at day 7.

EV/NETE is a combination of EV, an estrogen, and NETE, a progestogen with weak androgenic activity.

Through its progestogenic activity, NETE has potent antigonadotropic effects and can inhibit fertility and suppress sex hormone levels. A single intramuscular injection of EV/NETE has been found to strongly suppress testosterone levels in men. Levels of testosterone decreased from ~503 ng/dL at baseline to ~30 ng/dL at the lowest point (–94%) which occurred at day 7 post-injection.

=== Pharmacokinetics ===
Peak levels of estradiol after an intramuscular injection of EV/NETE (5 mg/50 mg) are reached within 2 days and range from 232 to 428 pg/mL.

== History ==
EV/NETE, along with estradiol cypionate/medroxyprogesterone acetate (EC/MPA; code name HRP-112), was developed by the World Health Organization. Both EV/NETE and EC/MPA became available in 1993.

== Society and culture ==
=== Generic names ===
EV/NETE is also known by its former developmental code name HRP-102.

=== Brand names ===
EV/NETE has been marketed under a variety of brand names including Chinese Injectable No. 3, Effectimes, Ginediol, Mesigyna, Mesilar, Meslart, Mesocept, Mesygest, Nofertyl, Nofertyl Lafrancol, Noregyna, Norestrin, Norifam, Norigynon, Nostidyn, Sexseg, and Solouna.

=== Availability ===
EV/NETE has been marketed in at least 36 countries, including Argentina, the Bahamas, Barbados, Bolivia, Brazil, Chile, Colombia, Costa Rica, the Dominican Republic, Ecuador, Egypt, El Salvador, Ghana, Grenada, Guatemala, Guyana, Haiti, Honduras, Jamaica, Kenya, Mexico, Nicaragua, Panama, Paraguay, Peru, St. Lucia, Turkey, Uruguay, Venezuela, and Zimbabwe. At least 15 of the countries in which EV/NETE is registered are Caribbean states. EV/NETE is the most widely used combined injectable contraceptive.

== See also ==
- Combined injectable birth control § Available forms
- Special Programme on Human Reproduction
- List of combined sex-hormonal preparations
