= Estradiol cypionate/testosterone cypionate =

Combination drug

Estradiol cypionate / testosterone cypionate

- Estradiol cypionate (top) and testosterone cypionate (bottom)

Combination of
- Estradiol cypionate: Estrogen
- Testosterone cypionate: Androgen; Anabolic steroid

Clinical data
- Trade names: Depo-Testadiol, Femovirin, depAndrogyn, others
- Other names: EC/TC
- Routes of administration: Intramuscular injection

Identifiers
- CAS Number: 8055-33-2

Estradiol cypionate/testosterone cypionate (EC/TC), sold under the brand names Depo-Testadiol and Femovirin among others, is an injectable combination medication of estradiol cypionate (EC), an estrogen, and testosterone cypionate (TC), an androgen/anabolic steroid, which is used in menopausal hormone therapy for women. It is specifically indicated for the treatment of moderate-to-severe vasomotor symptoms (i.e., hot flashes), but can also be used for other estrogen indications in women. The medication has also been used to suppress lactation in postpartum women.

Depo-Testadiol was provided in the form of 10 mL vials containing 2 mg/mL EC and 50 mg/mL TC in an oil solution and was administered by intramuscular injection once every 4 weeks. Conversely, Femovirin was provided in the form of 1 mL ampoules containing 3.5 mg/mL EC (2.4 mg/mL free estradiol) and 90 mg/mL TC (62.9 mg/mL free testosterone) in an oil solution and was administered by intramuscular injection once every 4 to 6 weeks. The elimination half-life of EC in oil by intramuscular injection is approximately 5 days, while the elimination half-life of TC in oil by intramuscular injection is approximately 8 days. EC/TP reportedly has a duration of about 21 days.

EC/TC likely poses a considerably increased risk of endometrial hyperplasia and cancer in women with intact uteruses (i.e., women who are not hysterectomized) if it is not combined with a progestogen. This is due to the EC component. The concomitant use of a progestogen will abolish such risks. The medication can also cause masculinization, such as acne, deepened voice, hirsutism, and increased sex drive, due to its TC component. Some of these masculinizing symptoms, such as voice deepening, can be irreversible.

Depo-Testadiol was introduced for medical use in 1954, while Femovirin was introduced for medical use in 1956. An oral tablet product with the same brand name of Femovirin, containing ethinylestradiol and methyltestosterone, was marketed in 1958, and should not be confused with the injectable Femovirin. Depo-Testadiol was discontinued in the United States by 2013. Both Depo-Testadiol and Femovirin have been discontinued in most other countries, but formulations of EC/TC under other brand names continue to be marketed in Taiwan.

Androgen replacement therapy formulations and dosages used in women
Route	Medication	Major brand names	Form	Dosage
Oral	Testosterone undecanoate	Andriol, Jatenzo	Capsule	40–80 mg 1x/1–2 days
Oral	Methyltestosterone	Metandren, Estratest	Tablet	0.5–10 mg/day
Oral	Fluoxymesterone	Halotestin	Tablet	1–2.5 mg 1x/1–2 days
Oral	Normethandrone^{a}	Ginecoside	Tablet	5 mg/day
Oral	Tibolone	Livial	Tablet	1.25–2.5 mg/day
Oral	Prasterone (DHEA)^{b}	–	Tablet	10–100 mg/day
Sublingual	Methyltestosterone	Metandren	Tablet	0.25 mg/day
Transdermal	Testosterone	Intrinsa	Patch	150–300 μg/day
Transdermal	Testosterone	AndroGel	Gel, cream	1–10 mg/day
Vaginal	Prasterone (DHEA)	Intrarosa	Insert	6.5 mg/day
Injection	Testosterone propionate^{a}	Testoviron	Oil solution	25 mg 1x/1–2 weeks
Injection	Testosterone enanthate	Delatestryl, Primodian Depot	Oil solution	25–100 mg 1x/4–6 weeks
Injection	Testosterone cypionate	Depo-Testosterone, Depo-Testadiol	Oil solution	25–100 mg 1x/4–6 weeks
Injection	Testosterone isobutyrate^{a}	Femandren M, Folivirin	Aqueous suspension	25–50 mg 1x/4–6 weeks
Injection	Mixed testosterone esters	Climacteron^{a}	Oil solution	150 mg 1x/4–8 weeks
Injection	Mixed testosterone esters	Omnadren, Sustanon	Oil solution	50–100 mg 1x/4–6 weeks
Injection	Nandrolone decanoate	Deca-Durabolin	Oil solution	25–50 mg 1x/6–12 weeks
Injection	Prasterone enanthate^{a}	Gynodian Depot	Oil solution	200 mg 1x/4–6 weeks
Implant	Testosterone	Testopel	Pellet	50–100 mg 1x/3–6 months
Notes: Premenopausal women produce about 230 ± 70 μg testosterone per day (6.4 ± 2.0 mg testosterone per 4 weeks), with a range of 130 to 330 μg per day (3.6–9.2 mg per 4 weeks). Footnotes: ^{a} = Mostly discontinued or unavailable. ^{b} = Over-the-counter. Sources: See template.

== See also ==
- List of combined sex-hormonal preparations
