= Special Programme on Human Reproduction =

The Human Reproduction Programme -UNDP/UNFPA/UNICEF/WHO/World Bank Special Programme of Research, Development and Research Training in Human Reproduction (HRP) is a WHO co-sponsored research programme on human reproduction. HRP is based at the WHO headquarters in Geneva, Switzerland. Its goal is to support and coordinate research on a global scale. It is part of the Sexual and Reproductive Health and Research (SRH) department of the WHO.

It resulted in the following marketed combined injectable contraceptives:

- Estradiol cypionate/medroxyprogesterone acetate (EC/MPA; brand names Cyclofem, Lunelle; code names HRP-112, Cyclo-Provera)
- Estradiol valerate/norethisterone enanthate (EV/NETE; brand name Mesigyna; code name HRP-102)

And in the following never-marketed progestogen injectable contraceptives:

- Levonorgestrel butanoate (LNG-B; code name HRP-002)
- Levonorgestrel cyclobutylcarboxylate (code name HRP-001)
- Levonorgestrel cyclopropylcarboxylate (code name HRP-003)

== Creation of the Human Reproduction Unit ==
Since the first United Nations World Population Conference, held in Rome in 1954, the United Nations had a growing interest in the issue of demography and associated it with the economic difficulties of developing countries. following a request of the UN General Assembly, the Secretary-General conducted an inquiry among the member-States and concluded there were indeed concerns among the developing countries about the growth of their populations. These findings were taken into account by the General Assembly in the resolution 1048 (XXXVII).

As the Second World Population Conference was meeting in Belgrade in 1965, the WHO was wondering how it could contribute. For the Director-General, as he said in a report demanded by the WHO Executive Council, "the importance of many medical, biological, social, cultural and economic factors in human reproduction makes it a major public health problem", which justified the decision to work on the demographic question, especially via the subject of human reproduction. The report was approved by the World Health Assembly, and it was decided to study sterility, the regulation of fertility, and the health aspect of demography. This mark the beginning of the Human Reproduction Unit. Its mission was to give technical advice on human reproduction aspects that were involved in public health.

== Development of the Unit and creation of a global program of research ==
The Human Reproduction Unit continued its mission and expanded its research not to only take into account strictly the medical aspect of human reproduction, but also economic, sociological, cultural, and psychological factors. The Unit was organizing meetings of experts and began to create a centre of documentation on human reproduction. In 1970, the WHO designated the Reproductive Endocrinology Research Unit of the Karolinska Institute of Stockholm as research and training centre on human reproduction.

Pleased by the progress made, the World Health Assembly requested the Director-General to consider a way to develop family planning services. In 1970, the WHO launched a feasibility study about a global program of research on human reproduction. A report was thus presented in 1971 and advocated for a five ways action plan. First, the designation of four Research and Training Centres, which would have to be leaders on the research on human reproduction in their respective region. Second, the collaboration with Clinical Research Centres to facilitate the clinical evaluation of new fertility regulating agents. Third, the creation of task Forces to conduct the research projects. Fourth, the creation of an international documentation centre on biomedical aspects of human reproduction (this point was not executed due to limited funding at the time). The fifth point was about secondary objectives and miscellaneous recommendations.

The Human Reproduction Unit was charged with the creation and administration of the new "Expanded Programme of Research, Development, and Research Training in Human Reproduction". In 1972, the World Health Assembly voted the WHA25.60 resolution "on WHO's role in the development and coordination of biomedical research", which requested the Director-General to "prepare proposals for the development of long-term WHO activities in biomedical research within the framework of the programmes being carried out by the Organization". He presented a report on this matter in December of the same year, including human reproduction and especially the Expanded Programme in the researches to fund. According to previous directors of the Programme, it is the date which formally established the HRP.

== Expanded Programme of Research, Development, and Research Training in Human Reproduction ==
The Expanded Programme was directed by an Advisory Group of 12 to 15 people designated by the Director-general. Their role was to advise the WHO on the policies, the strategies, the research priorities, and the resource affectation. The technical details of the scientific projects, the control of the publications and works of the Task Forces were delegated to a Review Group, which also designated the Clinical Research Centres.

In 1977, the Expanded Programme became the Special Programme.

== Evolution to a Co-sponsored Special Programme ==
In 1986, the structure of the Programme changed. The advisory Group was replaced by the Policy and Coordination Advisory Committee (PCAC), a consultative organ to the Director-General which made recommendations on issues linked to the policies, funding and general organization of the programme. It was composed of 30 members, twelve being the countries that contributed the most, twelve elected by the regional committees, three elected by the PCAC itself and the UNFPA, World Bank and IPPF as permanent members. The new structure also included the Scientific and Technical Advisory Group (STAG): composed of 10 to 15 members (experts and scientists) it designated the Programme research priorities, the creation or end of a task Force, and gave an independent evaluation of all scientific and technical aspect of the Programme.

In 1988, the co-sponsorship of the Programme began: the UNDP, UNFPA, World Bank and the WHO were co-sponsors of the "UNDP/UNFPA/WHO/World Bank Special Programme of Research, Development and Research Training in Human Reproduction", commonly referred to as "the HRP". This had to objective to obtain consequent and stable funding for the Programme. The PCAC became the Policy and Coordination Committee (PCC), in charge of the administration, the approval of the budget, and the general orientation of the work of the Programme and included the co-sponsors as permanent members. A Standing Committee, composed of representatives of the co-sponsors meets thrice a year, monitors the Programme situation and formulates recommendations to the PCC. As the executive agency, the WHO nominates the director of the Programme and other non-elected members of the HRP after consulting the Standing Committee. The STAG had also now to report to the Standing Committee while the Review Group is replaced by the Research Project Review Panel which had similar attributions, but includes also the control of the financial aspect of the research projects.

Finally, in 1996, the Gender Advisory Panel was created in order to keep particular attention to issues linked to gender inequities, mutilations and violence based on sex and rights based on sexual practice and orientation. It became the Gender and Rights Advisory Panel in 2007.

The HRP was still part of the Human Reproduction Unit, but other WHO organs were working on demography-linked subjects. Thus, in 1998, to avoid duplicate efforts, the Unit merged with the Reproductive Health Division into the Department of Reproductive Health and Research (RHR). The RHR was composed of the HRP, which was focused on research and training but without operational activities and the Programme Development in Reproductive Health (PDRH), which was tasked to translate the HRP's work into policies and operational actions. The STAG extended its attribution to also supervise the PDRH. Ultimately, following a global reform of the WHO structure in 2019, the RHR was placed under the responsibility of the UHC/Life Course Division and became the Department of Sexual and Reproductive Health and Research (SRH).

In 2012, UNICEF joined the co-sponsors.

== See also ==
- Concept Foundation
