= Norethisterone enanthate =

Chemical compound

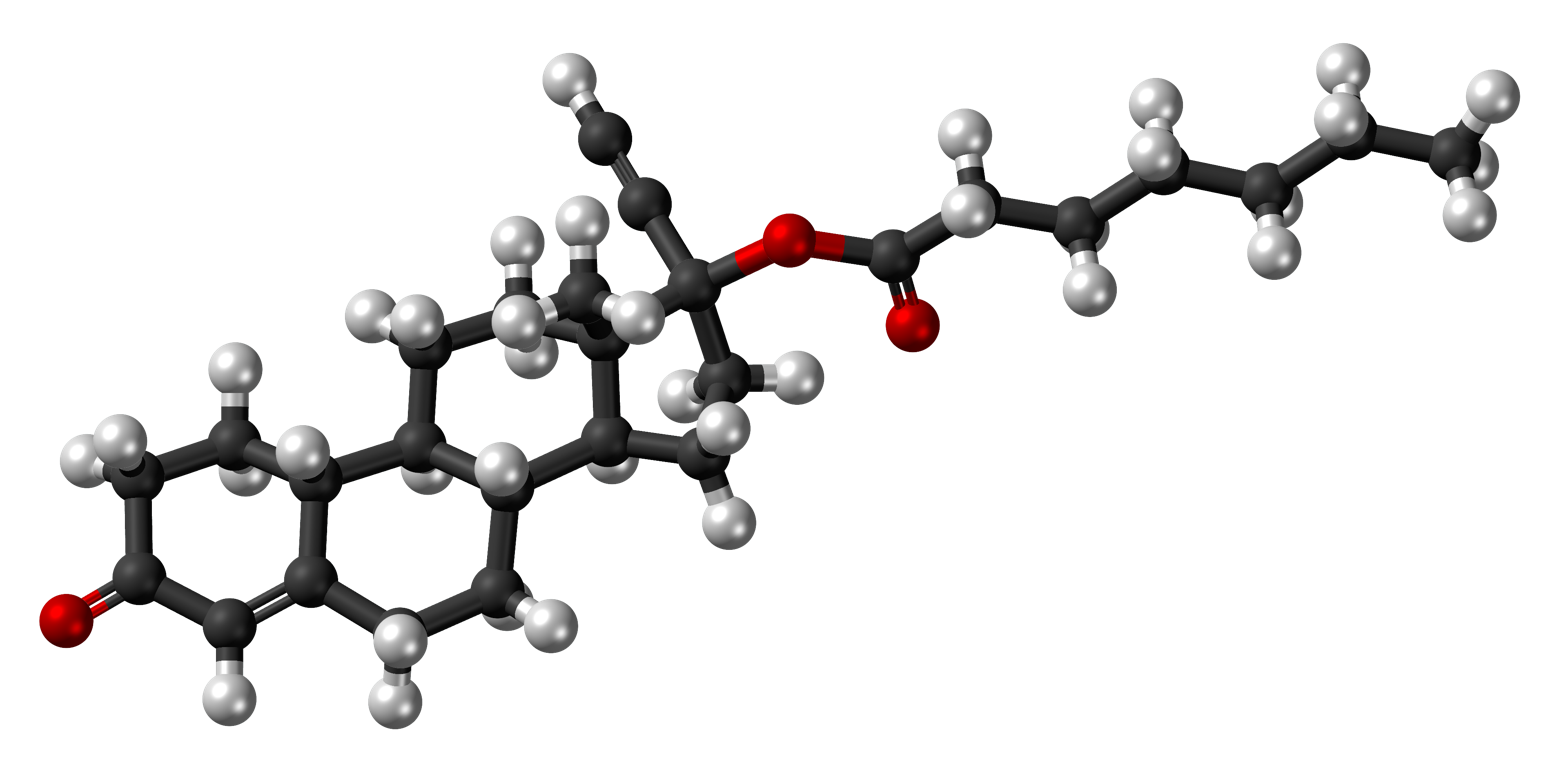

Clinical data
- Trade names: Noristerat, others
- Other names: NETE; NET-EN; Norethindrone enanthate; SH-393; 17α-Ethynyl-19-nortestosterone 17β-enanthate; 17α-Ethynylestra-4-en-17β-ol-3-one 17β-enanthate
- AHFS/Drugs.com: International Drug Names
- Routes of administration: Intramuscular injection
- Drug class: Progestogen; Progestin; Progestogen ester
- ATC code: G03DC02 (WHO)

Legal status
- Legal status: AU: S4 (Prescription only)

Identifiers
- IUPAC name: [(9S,10R,13S,14S,17R)-17-ethynyl-13-methyl-3-oxo-1,2,6,7,8,9,10,11,12,14,15,16-dodecahydrocyclopenta[a]phenanthren-17-yl] heptanoate
- CAS Number: 3836-23-5
- PubChem CID: 229295
- DrugBank: DB14678
- ChemSpider: 199613
- UNII: HY3S2K0J0F
- KEGG: C14486
- ChEBI: CHEBI:34894
- ChEMBL: ChEMBL3187229
- CompTox Dashboard (EPA): DTXSID2048664
- ECHA InfoCard: 100.021.207

Chemical and physical data
- Formula: C_{27}H_{38}O_{3}
- Molar mass: 410.598 g·mol^{−1}
- 3D model (JSmol): Interactive image
- SMILES: CCCCCCC(=O)O[C@]1(CC[C@@H]2[C@@]1(CC[C@H]3[C@H]2CCC4=CC(=O)CC[C@H]34)C)C#C
- InChI: InChI=1S/C27H38O3/c1-4-6-7-8-9-25(29)30-27(5-2)17-15-24-23-12-10-19-18-20(28)11-13-21(19)22(23)14-16-26(24,27)3/h2,18,21-24H,4,6-17H2,1,3H3/t21-,22+,23+,24-,26-,27-/m0/s1; Key:APTGJECXMIKIET-WOSSHHRXSA-N

Norethisterone enanthate (NET-EN), also known as norethindrone enanthate, is a form of hormonal birth control which is used to prevent pregnancy in women. It is used both as a form of progestogen-only injectable birth control and in combined injectable birth control formulations. It may be used following childbirth, miscarriage, or abortion. The failure rate per year in preventing pregnancy for the progestogen-only formulation is 2 per 100 women. Each dose of this form lasts two months with only up to two doses typically recommended.

Side effects include breast pain, headaches, depression, irregular menstrual periods, and pain at the site of injection. Use in those with liver disease is not recommended as is use during pregnancy due to risk of birth defects. Use appears to be okay during breastfeeding. It does not protect against sexually transmitted infections. NETE is an ester and prodrug of norethisterone, through which it works. It works as a method of birth control by stopping ovulation.

Norethisterone was patented in 1951 and NETE came into medical use in 1957. It is on the World Health Organization's List of Essential Medicines. It has been approved by itself in more than 60 countries including the United Kingdom and some in Europe, Central America, and Africa, and in combination with estradiol valerate in at least 36 countries mainly in Latin America. It is not available in the United States.

== Medical uses ==
NETE is used on its own as a long-lasting progestogen-only injectable contraceptive in women. It is administered via intramuscular injection once every two months.

== Side effects ==
Side effects of NETE may include breast pain, headaches, depression, irregular menstrual periods, and pain at the site of injection. It can cause birth defects in the fetus if used during pregnancy.

== Pharmacology ==
Norethisterone, the active form of NETE.

=== Pharmacodynamics ===
NETE is a prodrug of norethisterone in the body. Upon reaching circulation, it is rapidly converted into norethisterone by esterases. Hence, as a prodrug of norethisterone, NETE has essentially the same effects as norethisterone, acting as a potent progestogen with additional weak androgenic and estrogenic activity (the latter via its metabolite ethinylestradiol). NETA has some progestogenic activity of its own, but it is unclear if NETE does similarly.

NETE is of about 38% higher molecular weight than norethisterone due to the presence of its C17β enanthate ester.

Relative affinities (%) of norethisterone, metabolites, and prodrugs
Compound	Type^{a}	PR	AR	ER	GR	MR	SHBG	CBG
Norethisterone	–	67–75	15	0	0–1	0–3	16	0
5α-Dihydronorethisterone	Metabolite	25	27	0	0	?	?	?
3α,5α-Tetrahydronorethisterone	Metabolite	1	0	0–1	0	?	?	?
3α,5β-Tetrahydronorethisterone	Metabolite	?	0	0	?	?	?	?
3β,5α-Tetrahydronorethisterone	Metabolite	1	0	0–8	0	?	?	?
Ethinylestradiol	Metabolite	15–25	1–3	112	1–3	0	0.18	0
Norethisterone acetate	Prodrug	20	5	1	0	0	?	?
Norethisterone enanthate	Prodrug	?	?	?	?	?	?	?
Noretynodrel	Prodrug	6	0	2	0	0	0	0
Etynodiol	Prodrug	1	0	11–18	0	?	?	?
Etynodiol diacetate	Prodrug	1	0	0	0	0	?	?
Lynestrenol	Prodrug	1	1	3	0	0	?	?
Notes: Values are percentages (%). Reference ligands (100%) were promegestone for the PR, metribolone for the AR, estradiol for the ER, dexamethasone for the GR, aldosterone for the MR, dihydrotestosterone for SHBG, and cortisol for CBG. Footnotes: ^{a} = Active or inactive metabolite, prodrug, or neither of norethisterone. Sources: See template.

Parenteral potencies and durations of progestogens (Note: Sources:) (Note: All given by intramuscular or subcutaneous injection.)
Compound	Form	Dose for specific uses (mg) (Note: Progesterone production during the luteal phase is ~25 (15–50) mg/day. The OID of OHPC is 250 to 500 mg/month.)			DOA (Note: Duration of action in days.)
Compound	Form	TFD (Note: Usually given for 14 days.)	POICD (Note: Usually dosed every two to three months.)	CICD (Note: Usually dosed once monthly.)	DOA
Algestone acetophenide	Oil soln.	–	–	75–150	14–32 d
Gestonorone caproate	Oil soln.	25–50	–	–	8–13 d
Hydroxyprogest. acetate (Note: Never marketed or approved by this route.)	Aq. susp.	350	–	–	9–16 d
Hydroxyprogest. caproate	Oil soln.	250–500 (Note: In divided doses (2 × 125 or 250 mg for OHPC, 10 × 20 mg for P4).)	–	250–500	5–21 d
Medroxyprog. acetate	Aq. susp.	50–100	150	25	14–50+ d
Megestrol acetate	Aq. susp.	–	–	25	>14 d
Norethisterone enanthate	Oil soln.	100–200	200	50	11–52 d
Progesterone	Oil soln.	200	–	–	2–6 d
Progesterone	Aq. soln.	?	–	–	1–2 d
Progesterone	Aq. susp.	50–200	–	–	7–14 d
Notes and sources:

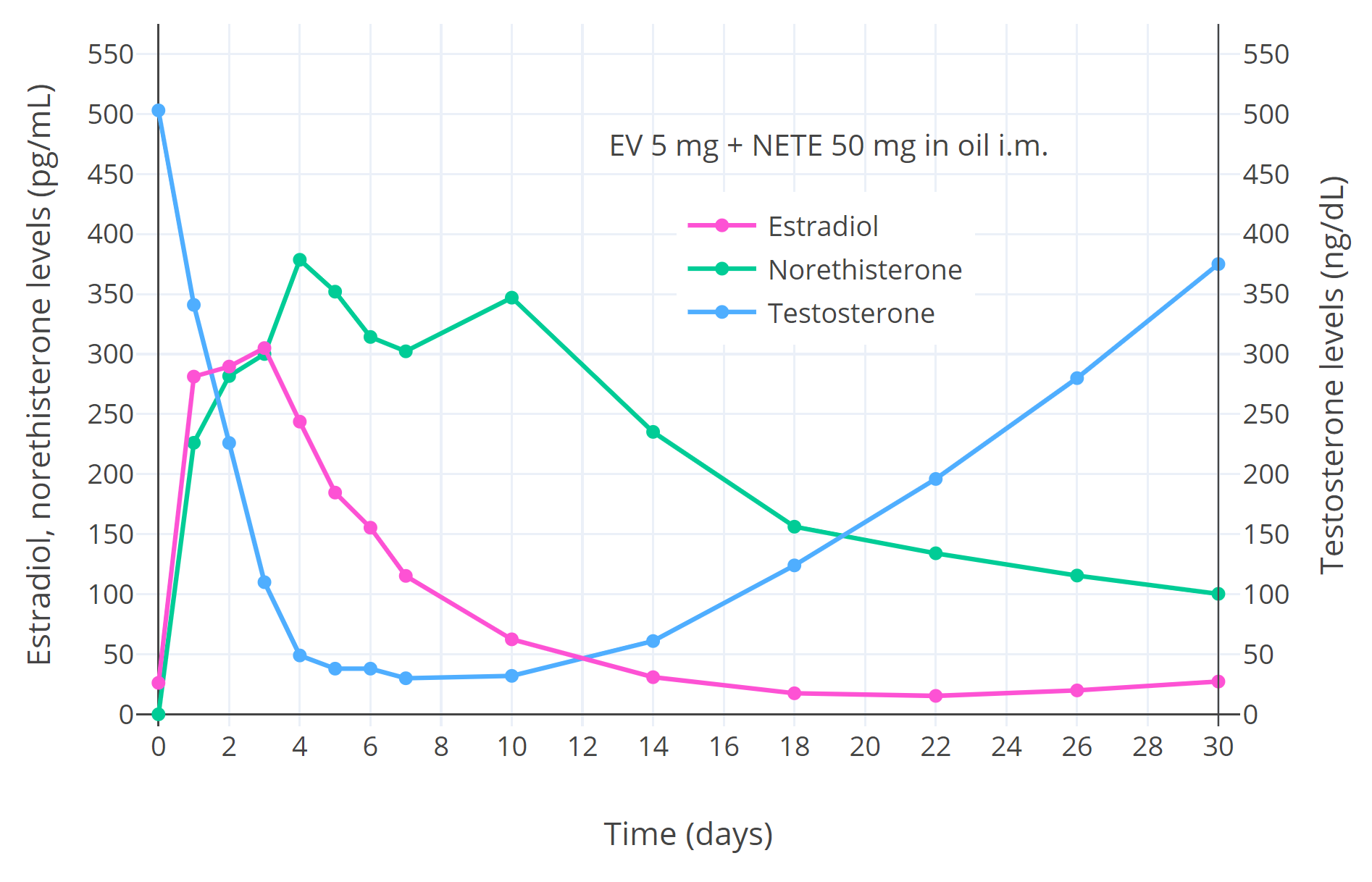
Hormone levels following a single intramuscular injection of estradiol valerate/norethisterone enanthate (5 mg/50 mg) (Mesigyna) in healthy young men. Testosterone levels were maximally suppressed by about 94%, to ~30 ng/dL, when measured at day 7 post-injection.

A single intramuscular injection of estradiol valerate/norethisterone enanthate (5 mg/50 mg) (Mesigyna) has been found to strongly suppress testosterone levels in men. Levels of testosterone decreased from ~503 ng/dL at baseline to ~30 ng/dL at the lowest point (–94%).

=== Pharmacokinetics ===
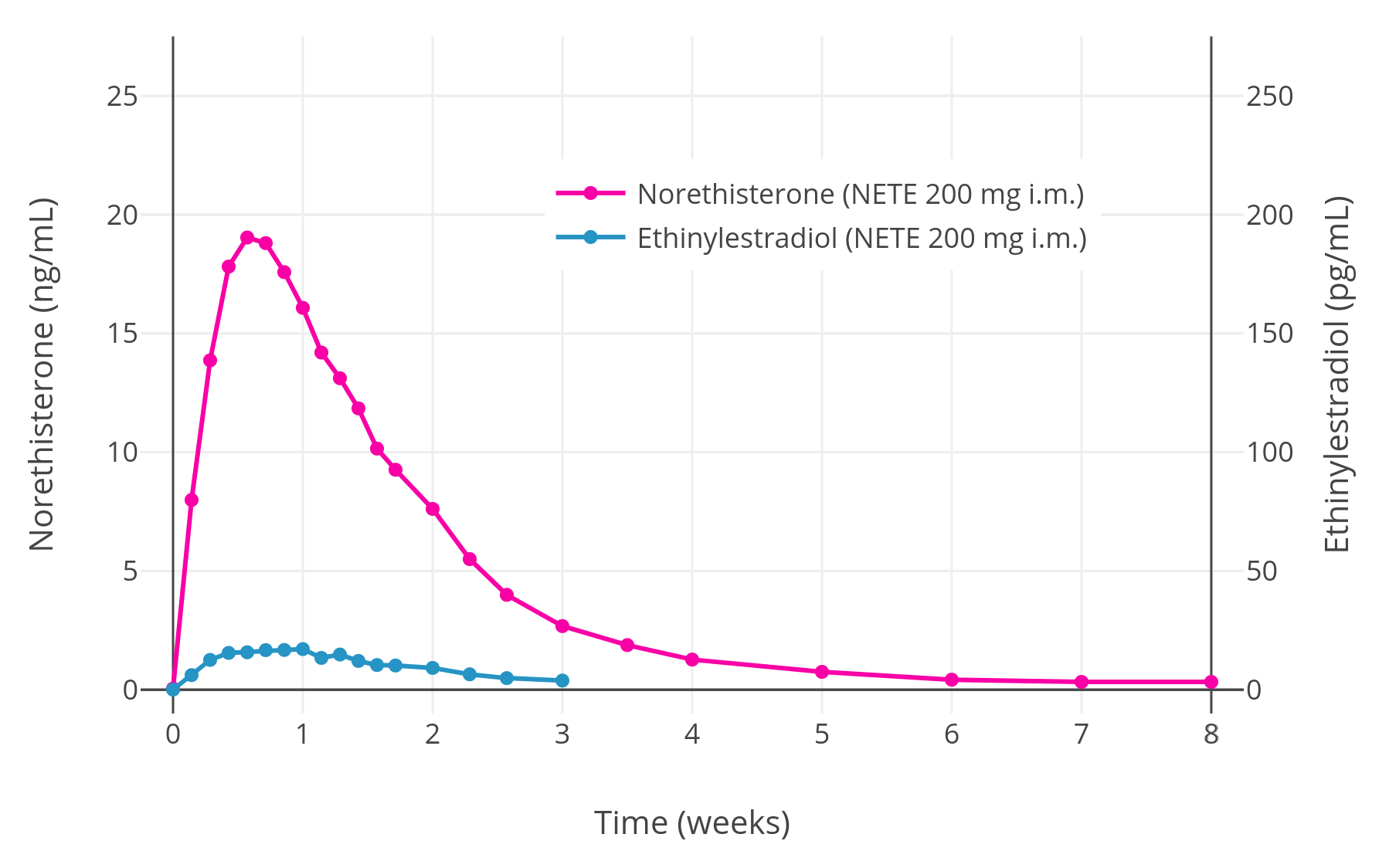
Norethisterone and ethinylestradiol levels over 8 weeks after a single intramuscular injection of 200 mg NETE in premenopausal women.

A single intramuscular injection of 50 to 200 mg NETE in oil solution has been found to have a duration of action of 11 to 52 days in terms of clinical biological effect in the uterus and on body temperature in women.

Similarly to oral norethisterone and norethisterone acetate, intramuscular NETE has been found to form ethinylestradiol as an active metabolite. With a single intramuscular injection of 200 mg NETE in premenopausal women, the mean maximum concentration of ethinylestradiol was 32% of that of a combined oral contraceptive containing 30 μg ethinylestradiol, the maximum equivalent oral dose of ethinylestradiol observed in the first few days of exposure was 20.3 μg/day, and the mean equivalent oral dose of ethinylestradiol over 8 weeks was 4.41 μg/day. As such, the exposure to ethinylestradiol was described as markedly lower than that of an oral contraceptive containing 30 μg ethinylestradiol. The estimated conversion rate of NETE into ethinylestradiol was 0.1%, which was much lower than that observed for oral norethisterone and norethisterone enanthate (0.2–1.0%), likely due to the lack of the first pass through the liver with parenteral administration. In accordance with the low levels of ethinylestradiol produced, no increase rates of thromboembolism or hepatic adenoma have been observed in post-authorization data of intramuscular NETE, and the medication does not resemble combined oral contraceptives containing ethinylestradiol in its safety profile.

== Chemistry ==
NETE, also known as norethinyltestosterone enanthate, as well as 17α-ethynyl-19-nortestosterone 17β-enanthate or 17α-ethynylestr-4-en-17β-ol-3-one 17β-enanthate, is a progestin, or synthetic progestogen, of the 19-nortestosterone group, and a synthetic estrane steroid. It is the C17β enanthate ester of norethisterone. NETE is a derivative of testosterone with an ethynyl group at the C17α position, the methyl group at the C19 position removed, and an enanthate ester attached at the C17β position. In addition to testosterone, it is a combined derivative of nandrolone (19-nortestosterone) and ethisterone (17α-ethynyltestosterone). Esters related to NETE include norethisterone acetate and levonorgestrel butanoate.

== History ==
NETE was introduced by Schering as Noristerat in 1957. It was the second long-acting progestogen to be used clinically, after hydroxyprogesterone caproate. The medication was the first progestogen-only injectable contraceptive, preceding medroxyprogesterone acetate (Depo-Provera).

== Society and culture ==
=== Generic names ===
Norethisterone enantate is the generic name of the drug and its INNM and BANM. It is also spelled as norethisterone enanthate and is also known as norethindrone enanthate (the USAN of norethisterone being norethindrone). NETE is known by its former developmental code name SH-393 as well.

=== Brand names ===
NETE has been marketed alone as a progestogen-only injectable contraceptive under the brand names Depocon, Doryxas, NET-EN, Noristat, Noristerat, Norigest, and Nur-Isterate, and in combination with estradiol valerate as a combined injectable contraceptive under the brand names Chinese Injectable No. 3, Efectimes, Ginediol, Mesigyna, Mesilar, Meslart, Mesocept, Mesygest, Nofertyl, Nofertyl Lafrancol, Noregyna, Norestrin, Norifam, Norigynon, Nostidyn, Sexseg, and Solouna.

Formulations and brand names of norethisterone and esters
Composition	Dose	Brand names	Use
NET only	Low (e.g., 0.35 mg)	Multiple (Note: Camila, Errin, Heather, Jencycla, Jolivette, Locilan, Micro-Novum, Micronovum, Micronor, Nor-QD, Nora, Noriday, Ortho Micronor)	Progestogen-only oral contraceptive
NET or NETA only	High (e.g., 5 mg, 10 mg)	Multiple (Note: Aygestin, Lupaneta Pack (combination pack with leuprorelin), Norcolut, Norlutate, Primolut N, Primolut Nor, SH-420, Utovlan)	Gynecological disorders and other uses
NETE only	Injection (e.g., 200 mg)	Multiple (Note: Depocon, Doryxas, NET-EN, Noristerat, Norigest, Nur-Isterate)	Progestogen-only injectable contraceptive
NET or NETA with ethinylestradiol	Low (e.g., 0.4 mg, 0.5 mg, 0.75 mg, 1 mg, 1.5 mg)	Multiple (Note: Aranelle, Balziva, Binovum, Brevicon, Brevinor, Briellyn, Cyclafem, Dasetta, Estrostep, Femcon, Generess, Gildagia, Gildess, Jinteli, Junel, Larin, Leena, Lo Loestrin, Lo Minastrin, Loestrin, Lolo, Lomedia, Microgestin, Minastrin, Modicon, Nelova, Norimin, Norinyl, Nortrel, Ortho, Ortho-Novum, Ovcon, Ovysmen, Philith, Primella, Select, Synphase, Synphasic, Tilia, Tri-Legest, Tri-Norinyl, Trinovum, Vyfemla, Wera, Wymzya, Zenchent, Zeosa)	Combined oral contraceptive
NET with mestranol	Low (e.g., 1 mg, 2 mg)	Multiple (Note: Norethin, Noriday, Norinyl, Norquen, Ortho-Novum, Sophia)	Combined oral contraceptive
NETA with estradiol	Low (e.g., 0.1 mg, 0.5 mg)	Multiple (Note: Activella, Activelle, Alyacen, Cliane, Climagest, Climesse, Cliovelle, CombiPatch, Elleste Duet, Estalis, Estropause, Eviana, Evorel, Kliane, Kliofem, Kliogest, Kliovance, Mesigyna, Mesygest, Mimvey, Necon, Novofem, Nuvelle, Sequidot, Systen, Trisequens)	Combined menopausal hormone therapy
NETE with estradiol valerate	Injection (e.g., 50 mg)	Multiple (Note: Chinese Injectable No. 3, Efectimes, Ginediol, Mesigyna, Mesilar, Meslart, Mesocept, Mesygest, Nofertyl, Nofertyl Lafrancol, Noregyna, Norestrin, Norifam, Norigynon, Nostidyn, Sexseg, Solouna)	Combined injectable contraceptive
Abbreviations: NET = Norethisterone. NETA = Norethisterone acetate. NETE = Norethisterone enanthate. Sources: Notes:

=== Availability ===
NETE has been approved for use alone as a progestogen-only injectable contraceptive in more than 60 countries throughout the world including in Europe, Latin America, Asia, and Africa. Specific countries in which NETE as a standalone medication is or has been available include Bangladesh, France, Germany, India, Italy, Malaysia, Mexico, the Philippines, Singapore, South Africa, Thailand, and the United Kingdom.

NETE has been approved for use in combination with estradiol valerate as a combined injectable contraceptive in at least 36 countries, mostly in Latin America but also in Africa. It is or has been available in combination with estradiol valerate in Argentina, the Bahamas, Barbados, Bolivia, Brazil, Chile, Colombia, Costa Rica, the Dominican Republic, Ecuador, Egypt, El Salvador, Ghana, Grenada, Guatemala, Guyana, Haiti, Honduras, Jamaica, Kenya, Mexico, Nicaragua, Panama, Paraguay, Peru, St. Lucia, Turkey, Uruguay, Venezuela, and Zimbabwe.

NETE is not available in any form in the United States.

== Research ==
NETE was studied by Schering for use as a progestogen-only injectable contraceptive at a dose of 25 mg once a month but produced poor cycle control with this regimen and was not marketed.

NETE has been studied for use as a potential male hormonal contraceptive in combination with testosterone in men.

== See also ==
- Estradiol valerate/norethisterone enantate
- Estradiol undecylate/norethisterone enanthate
