= Estradiol cypionate/medroxyprogesterone acetate =

Pharmaceutical combination

Estradiol cypionate / medroxyprogesterone acetate

- Estradiol cypionate (top) and medroxy- progesterone acetate (bottom)

Combination of
- Estradiol cypionate: Estrogen
- Medroxyprogesterone acetate: Progestogen

Clinical data
- Trade names: Cyclofem, Lunelle, others
- Other names: EC/MPA; Cyclo-Provera; HRP-112
- AHFS/Drugs.com: Micromedex Detailed Consumer Information
- Pregnancy category: X
- Routes of administration: Intramuscular injection
- ATC code: G03AA08 (WHO)

Legal status
- Legal status: US: Withdrawn

Identifiers
- CAS Number: 313-06-4; 71-58-9
- PubChem CID: 62995
- UNII: 7E1DV054LO; C2QI4IOI2G

Estradiol cypionate/medroxyprogesterone acetate (EC/MPA), sold under the brand name Cyclofem among others, is a form of combined injectable birth control. It contains estradiol cypionate (EC), an estrogen, and medroxyprogesterone acetate (MPA), a progestin. It is recommended for short-term use and is given once a month by injection into a muscle.

Common side effects of EC/MPA include irregular menstrual periods which typically improves with time. Other side effects include blood clots, headache, hair loss, depression, nausea, and breast pain. Use during pregnancy is not recommended. Use during breastfeeding is likely safe. It works mainly by preventing ovulation.

EC/MPA came into medical use in 1993 with approval in the United States in 2000. It is on the World Health Organization's List of Essential Medicines. The medication is approved for use in 18 countries. It is used in Mexico, Thailand, and Indonesia, among other countries. It is no longer commercially available in the United States.

== Medical uses ==
EC/MPA is used as a once-monthly combined injectable contraceptive to prevent pregnancy in women.

=== Available forms ===
EC/MPA is available in the form of a microcrystalline aqueous suspension of 5 mg EC and 25 mg MPA given in a 0.5 mL aqueous solution for intramuscular injection once per month. It is provided in the form of single-dose vials and ampoules. The particle sizes of the formulation are 93% within a range of 5 to 16 μm.

== History ==
Depot MPA (DMPA) and EC/MPA were developed by Upjohn in the 1960s. DMPA (brand name Depo-Provera) was introduced for use as a progestogen-only injectable contraceptive for the first time outside of the United States in 1969 and was subsequently approved for use in birth control in the United States in 1992. A variety of preliminary studies on EC/MPA as a contraceptive were published between 1968 and 1978. In the late 1970s, the World Health Organization (WHO) began an initiative known as the Special Programme of Research, Development and Research Training in Human Reproduction (WHO/HRP) to develop combined injectable contraceptives as part of its efforts to increase the availability and choices of birth control for women and men throughout the world. They sought to remedy the side effect of menstrual irregularity that is the major reason for discontinuation of progestogen-only injectable contraceptives like DMPA via incorporation of an estrogen. Funding for the initiative was provided by the United Nations Development Programme (UNDP), United Nations Population Fund (UNFPA), and World Bank.

In 1980, the WHO conducted a pharmacokinetic study of estradiol cypionate, estradiol valerate, and estradiol benzoate to determine which ester(s) would be most suitable for use in combined injectable contraceptives. Following the initial development of the medication by Upjohn under the code name Cyclo-Provera previously, EC/MPA was developed as a combined injectable contraceptive by the World Health Organization under the code name HRP-112 in the 1980s and early 1990s. The WHO also developed estradiol valerate/norethisterone enantate (code name HRP-102) as a combined injectable contraceptive. Development of EC/MPA was completed by the early 1990s and the medication was licensed to the WHO/HRP-established Concept Foundation as well as several pharmaceutical companies. EC/MPA was introduced for use as a combined injectable contraceptive under the brand name Cyclofem and others in Mexico, Thailand, and Indonesia in 1993. It was available in 18 countries, mostly in Latin America and Asia, by 1998. In late 2000, EC/MPA was introduced for use as a combined injectable contraceptive by Upjohn under the brand name Lunelle in the United States. However, the formulation was discontinued in the United States in late 2003.

== Society and culture ==
=== Generic names ===
EC/MPA was originally known as Cyclo-Provera (or Cycloprovera), and is also known by its former developmental code name HRP-112.

=== Brand names ===
Brand names of EC/MPA include Ciclofem, Ciclofemina, Cyclofem, Cyclofemina, Cyclogeston, Femelin, Femydrol, Gestin, Harmonis, Lunella, Lunelle, and Novafem.

=== Availability ===
EC/MPA has been approved for use in at least 18 countries. It is or has been used in Bolivia, Brazil, Chile, China, Colombia, Costa Rica, the Dominican Republic, Ecuador, El Salvador, Guatemala, Hong Kong, Indonesia, Malaysia, Mexico, Panama, Peru, Thailand, the United States, and Zimbabwe, among other countries. The medication is no longer available in the United States.

== See also ==
- Combined injectable birth control § Available forms
- Conjugated estrogens/medroxyprogesterone acetate
- Estradiol/medroxyprogesterone acetate
- List of combined sex-hormonal preparations
- List of sex-hormonal aqueous suspensions
