= Levonorgestrel butanoate =

Chemical compound

Clinical data
- Other names: LNG-B; HRP-002; Levonorgestrel 17β-butanoate; 17α-Ethynyl-18-methyl-19-nortestosterone 17β-butanoate; 17α-Ethynyl-18-methylestr-4-en-17β-ol-3-one 17β-butanoate
- Routes of administration: Intramuscular injection
- Drug class: Progestogen; Progestogen ester
- ATC code: None

Identifiers
- IUPAC name: [(8R,9S,10R,13S,14S,17R)-13-ethyl-17-ethynyl-3-oxo-1,2,6,7,8,9,10,11,12,14,15,16-dodecahydrocyclopenta[a]phenanthren-17-yl] butanoate
- CAS Number: 86679-33-6
- PubChem CID: 3086228
- ChemSpider: 2342903
- UNII: L929CBB126
- CompTox Dashboard (EPA): DTXSID801166916
- ECHA InfoCard: 100.081.125

Chemical and physical data
- Formula: C_{25}H_{34}O_{3}
- Molar mass: 382.544 g·mol^{−1}
- 3D model (JSmol): Interactive image
- SMILES: CCCC(=O)O[C@]1(CC[C@@H]2[C@@]1(CC[C@H]3[C@H]2CCC4=CC(=O)CC[C@H]34)CC)C#C
- InChI: InChI=1S/C25H34O3/c1-4-7-23(27)28-25(6-3)15-13-22-21-10-8-17-16-18(26)9-11-19(17)20(21)12-14-24(22,25)5-2/h3,16,19-22H,4-5,7-15H2,1-2H3/t19-,20+,21+,22-,24-,25-/m0/s1; Key:GPKLGCALNRZIDS-AYEDEZQKSA-N

Levonorgestrel butanoate (LNG-B) (developmental code name HRP-002), or levonorgestrel 17β-butanoate, is a steroidal progestin of the 19-nortestosterone group which was developed by the World Health Organization (WHO) in collaboration with the Contraceptive Development Branch (CDB) of the National Institute of Child Health and Human Development as a long-acting injectable contraceptive. It is the C17β butanoate ester of levonorgestrel, and acts as a prodrug of levonorgestrel in the body. The drug is at or beyond the phase III stage of clinical development, but has not been marketed at this time. It was first described in the literature, by the WHO, in 1983, and has been under investigation for potential clinical use since then.

LNG-B has been under investigation as a long-lasting injectable contraceptive for women. A single intramuscular injection of an aqueous suspension of 5 or 10 mg LNG-B has a duration of 3 months, whereas an injection of 50 mg has a duration of 6 months. The drug was also previously tested successfully as a combined injectable contraceptive with estradiol hexahydrobenzoate, but this formulation was never marketed. LNG-B has been tested successfully in combination with testosterone buciclate as a long-lasting injectable contraceptive for men as well.

LNG-B may have several advantages over depot medroxyprogesterone acetate, including the use of much lower comparative dosages, reduced progestogenic side effects like hypogonadism and amenorrhea, and a more rapid return in fertility following discontinuation. The drug has a well-established safety record owing to the use of levonorgestrel as an oral contraceptive since the 1960s.

Parenteral potencies and durations of progestogens (Note: Sources:) (Note: All given by intramuscular or subcutaneous injection.)
Compound	Form	Dose for specific uses (mg) (Note: Progesterone production during the luteal phase is ~25 (15–50) mg/day. The OID of OHPC is 250 to 500 mg/month.)			DOA (Note: Duration of action in days.)
Compound	Form	TFD (Note: Usually given for 14 days.)	POICD (Note: Usually dosed every two to three months.)	CICD (Note: Usually dosed once monthly.)	DOA
Algestone acetophenide	Oil soln.	-	–	75–150	14–32 d
Gestonorone caproate	Oil soln.	25–50	–	–	8–13 d
Hydroxyprogest. acetate (Note: Never marketed or approved by this route.)	Aq. susp.	350	–	–	9–16 d
Hydroxyprogest. caproate	Oil soln.	250–500 (Note: In divided doses (2 × 125 or 250 mg for OHPC, 10 × 20 mg for P4).)	–	250–500	5–21 d
Medroxyprog. acetate	Aq. susp.	50–100	150	25	14–50+ d
Megestrol acetate	Aq. susp.	-	–	25	>14 d
Norethisterone enanthate	Oil soln.	100–200	200	50	11–52 d
Progesterone	Oil soln.	200	–	–	2–6 d
Progesterone	Aq. soln.	?	–	–	1–2 d
Progesterone	Aq. susp.	50–200	–	–	7–14 d
Notes and sources:

== See also ==
- List of progestogen esters § Esters of 19-nortestosterone derivatives
- Progestogen-only injectable contraceptive
- Special Programme on Human Reproduction
