= Macrocrystalline =

In geology, macrocrystalline rocks have crystals large enough to easily be identified by sight with the naked eye.

Macrocrystalline rocks can be further subdivided into fine-grained, medium-grained, large-grained, and coarse-grained rock, where fine-grained rocks have a grain size of less than 1 mm, medium-grained rocks have a grain size of 1 to 5 mm, large-grained rocks one of 5 to 10 mm, and coarse-grained rocks one larger than 10 mm. Some macrocrystalline rocks may also have a porphyritic texture. Crystals requiring microscopic or X-ray analysis for identification are termed microcrystalline or cryptocrystalline.

Macrocrystalline or phaneritic texture is common in intrusive igneous rocks that cooled slowly enough for crystal growth. Pegmatites are noted for their large crystal size. The texture is also commonly found in late-diagenetic dolomite, recrystallized limestone, and some types of anhydrite.

== See also ==
- Cryptocrystalline – Type of rock texture
- Microcrystalline
- Nanocrystalline
- Protocrystalline
- Rock microstructure – Relationship between materials which compose a rock
