= Estradiol cypionate =

Chemical compound

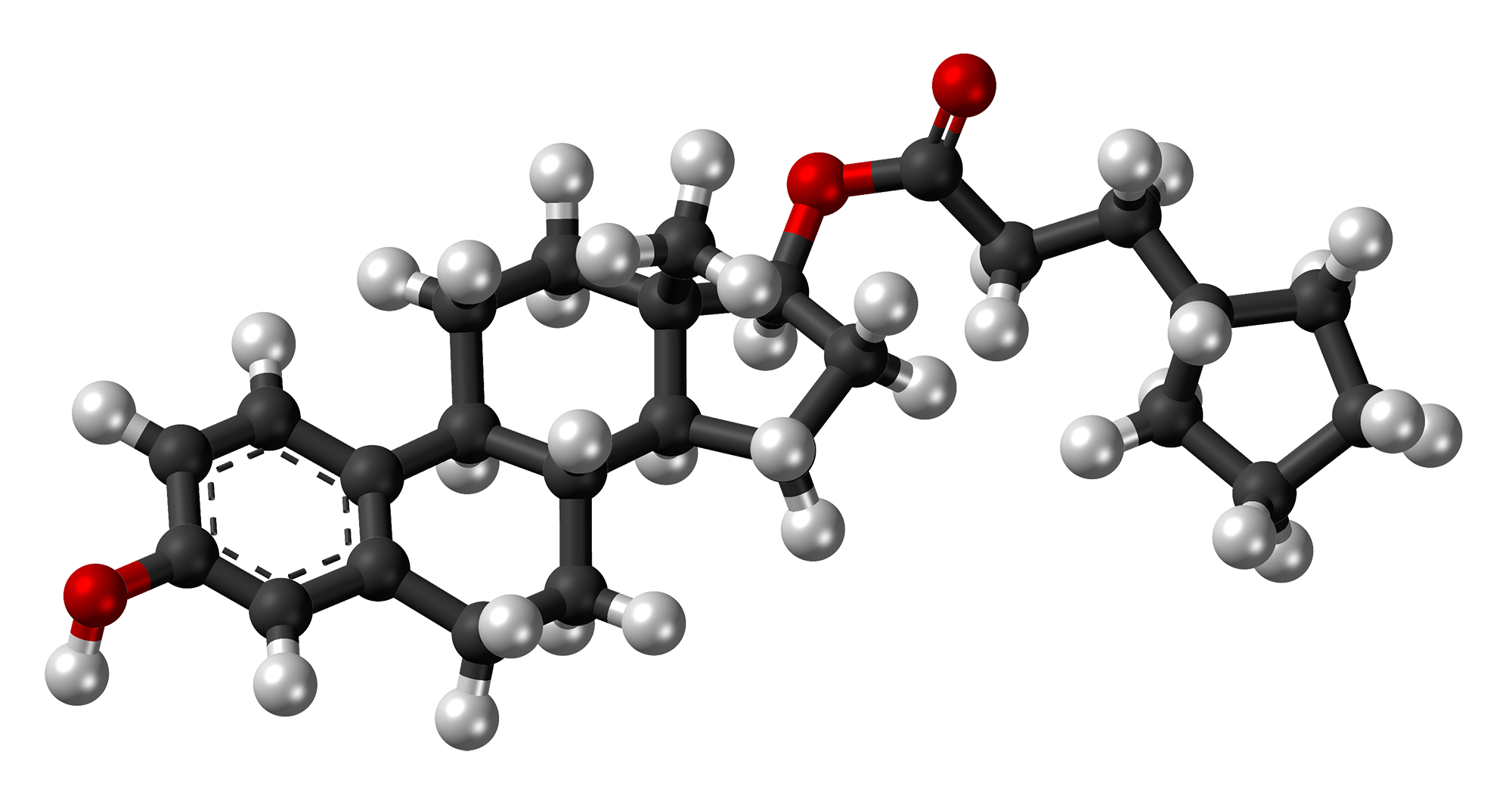

Clinical data
- Pronunciation: /ˌɛstrəˈdaɪoʊl sɪˈpaɪoʊneɪt/ ES-trə-DY-ohl sih-PY-oh-nate
- Trade names: Depo-Estradiol, Depofemin, Estradep, many others
- Other names: EC; E2C; Estradiol cipionate; Estradiol cyclopentylpropionate; ECP; Estradiol 17β-cyclopentylpropionate; Estradiol 17β-cyclopentanepropionate
- Routes of administration: Intramuscular injection, subcutaneous injection
- Drug class: Estrogen; Estrogen ester
- ATC code: G03CA03 (WHO)

Legal status
- Legal status: In general: ℞ (Prescription only)

Pharmacokinetic data
- Bioavailability: IM: High
- Protein binding: Estradiol: ~98% (to albumin and SHBG)
- Metabolism: Cleavage via esterases in the liver, blood, and tissues
- Metabolites: Estradiol, cypionic acid, and metabolites of estradiol
- Elimination half-life: IM (aqueous suspension): 8–10 days
- Duration of action: IM (oil): 5 mg ≈ 11–14 days IM (aqueous suspension): 5 mg ≈ 14–24 days
- Excretion: Urine

Identifiers
- IUPAC name: [(8R,9S,13S,14S,17S)-3-hydroxy-13-methyl-6,7,8,9,11,12,14,15,16,17-decahydrocyclopenta[a]phenanthren-17-yl] 3-cyclopentylpropanoate
- CAS Number: 313-06-4
- PubChem CID: 9403
- DrugBank: DB13954
- ChemSpider: 9033
- UNII: 7E1DV054LO
- KEGG: D04063
- ChEBI: CHEBI:34745
- ChEMBL: ChEMBL1200973
- CompTox Dashboard (EPA): DTXSID4022999
- ECHA InfoCard: 100.005.672

Chemical and physical data
- Formula: C_{26}H_{36}O_{3}
- Molar mass: 396.571 g·mol^{−1}
- 3D model (JSmol): Interactive image
- Melting point: 151 to 152 °C (304 to 306 °F)
- SMILES: C[C@]12CC[C@H]3[C@H]([C@@H]1CC[C@@H]2OC(=O)CCC4CCCC4)CCC5=C3C=CC(=C5)O
- InChI: InChI=1S/C26H36O3/c1-26-15-14-21-20-10-8-19(27)16-18(20)7-9-22(21)23(26)11-12-24(26)29-25(28)13-6-17-4-2-3-5-17/h8,10,16-17,21-24,27H,2-7,9,11-15H2,1H3/t21-,22-,23+,24+,26+/m1/s1; Key:UOACKFBJUYNSLK-XRKIENNPSA-N

Estradiol cypionate (EC), sold under the brand name Depo-Estradiol among others, is an estrogen medication which is used in hormone therapy for menopausal symptoms and low estrogen levels in women, in hormone therapy for trans women, and in hormonal birth control for women. It is given by injection into muscle once every 1 to 4 weeks.

Side effects of estradiol cypionate include breast tenderness, breast enlargement, nausea, headache, and fluid retention. Estradiol cypionate is an estrogen and hence is an agonist of the estrogen receptor, the biological target of estrogens like estradiol. Estradiol cypionate is an estrogen ester and a long-lasting prodrug of estradiol in the body. Because of this, it is considered to be a natural and bioidentical form of estrogen.

Estradiol cypionate was first described as well as introduced for medical use in 1952. Along with estradiol valerate, it is one of the most commonly used esters of estradiol. Estradiol cypionate has mostly been used in the United States, but is also marketed in a few other countries. The medication is not available in Europe. It is not currently available as a generic medication in the United States.

== Medical uses ==
The medical uses of estradiol cypionate are the same as those of estradiol and other estrogens. Examples of indications for the drug include hormone therapy and hormonal contraception. In regard to the latter, estradiol cypionate has been used in combination with medroxyprogesterone acetate as a combined injectable contraceptive. Along with estradiol valerate, estradiol undecylate, and estradiol benzoate, estradiol cypionate is used as a form of high-dose estrogen therapy in feminizing hormone therapy for transgender women. The medication has been used to induce puberty in girls with delayed puberty due to hypogonadism.

Estradiol cypionate is usually used at a dosage of 1 to 5 mg by intramuscular injection every 3 to 4 weeks in the treatment of menopausal symptoms such as hot flashes and vaginal atrophy, at a dosage of 1.5 to 2 mg by intramuscular injection once a month in the treatment of female hypoestrogenism due to hypogonadism, and at a dosage of 2 to 10 mg by intramuscular injection once every 1 or 2 weeks for hormone therapy in transgender women. The doses used to induce puberty in girls are 0.2 to 2.5 mg per month, gradually increased over a period of 4 years.

Estrogen dosages for menopausal hormone therapy
Route/form	Estrogen	Low	Standard	High
Oral	Estradiol	0.5–1 mg/day	1–2 mg/day	2–4 mg/day
Oral	Estradiol valerate	0.5–1 mg/day	1–2 mg/day	2–4 mg/day
Oral	Estradiol acetate	0.45–0.9 mg/day	0.9–1.8 mg/day	1.8–3.6 mg/day
Oral	Conjugated estrogens	0.3–0.45 mg/day	0.625 mg/day	0.9–1.25 mg/day
Oral	Esterified estrogens	0.3–0.45 mg/day	0.625 mg/day	0.9–1.25 mg/day
Oral	Estropipate	0.75 mg/day	1.5 mg/day	3 mg/day
Oral	Estriol	1–2 mg/day	2–4 mg/day	4–8 mg/day
Oral	Ethinylestradiol^{a}	2.5–10 μg/day	5–20 μg/day	–
Nasal spray	Estradiol	150 μg/day	300 μg/day	600 μg/day
Transdermal patch	Estradiol	25 μg/day^{b}	50 μg/day^{b}	100 μg/day^{b}
Transdermal gel	Estradiol	0.5 mg/day	1–1.5 mg/day	2–3 mg/day
Vaginal	Estradiol	25 μg/day	–	–
Vaginal	Estriol	30 μg/day	0.5 mg 2x/week	0.5 mg/day
IM or SC injection	Estradiol valerate	–	–	4 mg 1x/4 weeks
IM or SC injection	Estradiol cypionate	1 mg 1x/3–4 weeks	3 mg 1x/3–4 weeks	5 mg 1x/3–4 weeks
IM or SC injection	Estradiol benzoate	0.5 mg 1x/week	1 mg 1x/week	1.5 mg 1x/week
SC implant	Estradiol	25 mg 1x/6 months	50 mg 1x/6 months	100 mg 1x/6 months
Footnotes: ^{a} = No longer used or recommended, due to health concerns. ^{b} = As a single patch applied once or twice per week (worn for 3–4 days or 7 days), depending on the formulation. Note: Dosages are not necessarily equivalent. Sources: See template.

=== Available forms ===
Estradiol cypionate is and has been available as an oil solution for intramuscular injection provided in vials and ampoules at concentrations of 1, 3, and 5 mg/mL (and containing 5, 10, 15, 25, or 50 mg estradiol cypionate total). The 1 and 3 mg/mL concentrations (containing 5 and 15 mg estradiol cypionate total) have been discontinued in the United States, but the 5 mg/mL concentration (containing 25 mg estradiol cypionate total) remains available. Aside from estradiol cypionate, the only other injectable estrogen formulations that remain available in the United States are estradiol valerate (10 mg/mL, 20 mg/mL, and 40 mg/mL in oil) and conjugated estrogens (25 mg/vial in solution).

In addition to single-drug formulations, estradiol cypionate has been marketed in combination with medroxyprogesterone acetate as a microcrystalline aqueous suspension (brand name Lunelle) and in combination with testosterone cypionate as an oil solution (brand name Depo-Testadiol).

Available forms of estradiol (Note: This table includes primarily products available as a single-ingredient estradiol preparation—thus excluding compounds with progestogens or other ingredients included. The table furthermore does not include compounded drugs—only commercially produced products. Availability of each product varies by country.)
Route	Ingredient	Form	Dose (Note: Doses are given per unit (ex: per tablet, per mL).)	Brand names (Note: Other brand names may be manufactured or previously manufactured.)
Oral	Estradiol	Tablet	0.1, 0.2, 0.5, 1, 2, 4 mg	Estrace, Ovocyclin
Oral	Estradiol valerate	Tablet	0.5, 1, 2, 4 mg	Progynova
Transdermal	Estradiol	Patch	14, 25, 37.5, 50, 60, 75, 100 µg/d	Climara, Vivelle
Transdermal	Estradiol	Gel pump	0.06% (0.52, 0.75 mg/pump)	Elestrin, EstroGel
Transdermal	Estradiol	Gel packet	0.1% (0.25, 0.5, 1.0 mg/pk.)	DiviGel, Sandrena
Transdermal	Estradiol	Emulsion	0.25% (25 µg/pouch)	Estrasorb
Transdermal	Estradiol	Spray	1.53 mg/spray	Evamist, Lenzetto
Vaginal	Estradiol	Tablet	10, 25 µg	Vagifem
Vaginal	Estradiol	Cream	0.01% (0.1 mg/gram)	Estrace
Vaginal	Estradiol	Insert	4, 10 µg	Imvexxy
Vaginal	Estradiol	Ring	2 mg/ring (7.5 µg/d, 3 mon.)	Estring
Vaginal	Estradiol acetate	Ring	50, 100 µg/d, 3 months	Femring
Injection (Note: By intramuscular or subcutaneous injection.)	Estradiol	Microspheres	1 mg/mL	Juvenum E
Injection	Estradiol benzoate	Oil solution	0.167, 0.2, 0.333, 1, 1.67, 2, 5, 10, 20, 25 mg/mL	Progynon-B
Injection	Estradiol cypionate	Oil solution	1, 3, 5 mg/mL	Depo-Estradiol
Injection	Estradiol valerate	Oil solution	5, 10, 20, 40 mg/mL	Progynon Depot
Implant	Estradiol	Pellet	20, 25, 50, 100 mg, 6 mon.	Estradiol Implants
Notes and sources: Sources:

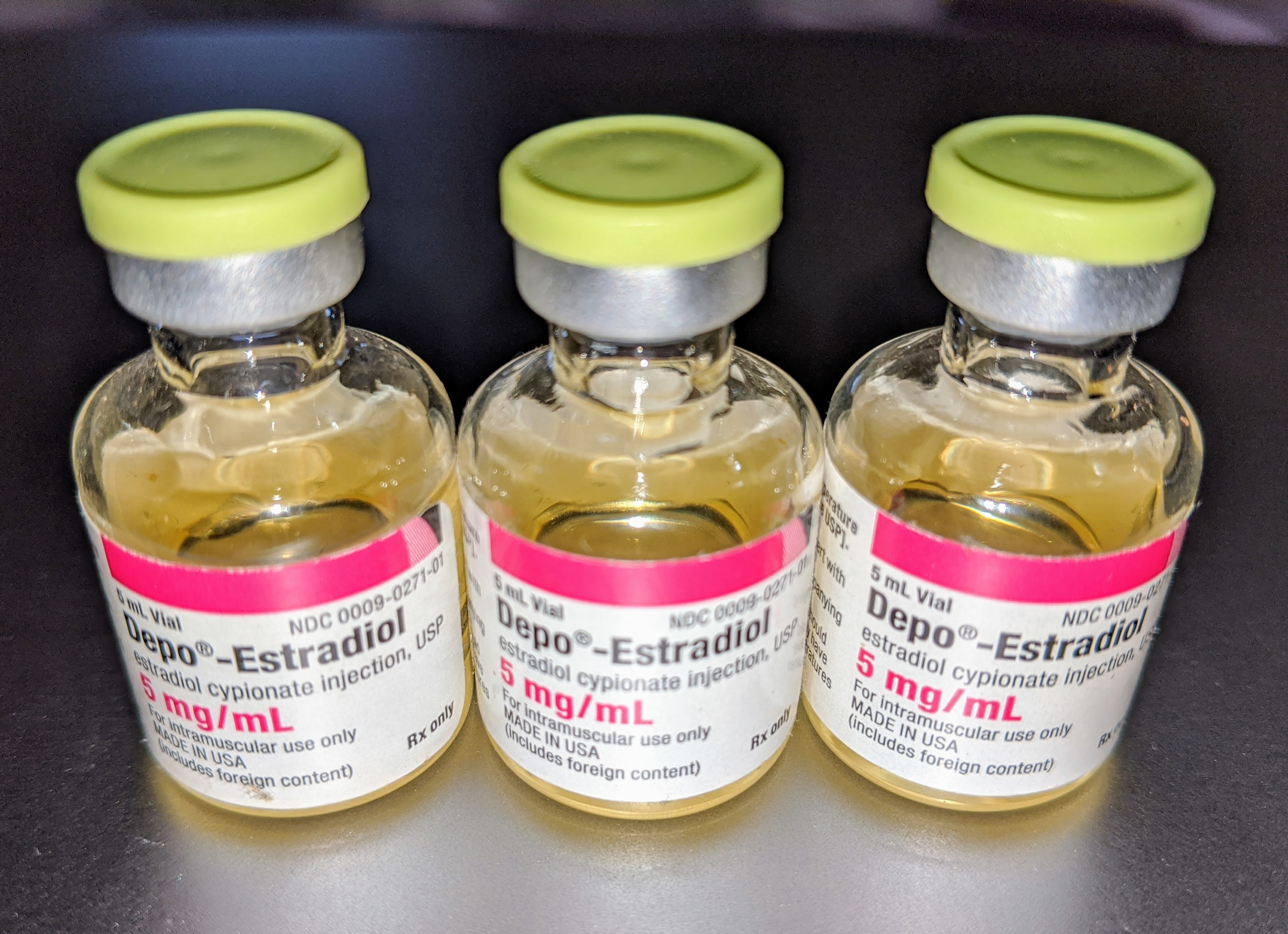
5-mL vials of Depo-Estradiol (5 mg/mL estradiol cypionate in cottonseed oil solution for use by intramuscular injection) in the United States.

== Contraindications ==
Contraindications of estrogens include coagulation problems, cardiovascular diseases, liver disease, and certain hormone-sensitive cancers such as breast cancer and endometrial cancer, among others.

== Side effects ==
The side effects of estradiol cypionate are the same as those of estradiol. Examples of such side effects include breast tenderness and enlargement, nausea, vomiting, bloating, edema, headache, migraine, and melasma. High-dose estrogen therapy with estradiol cypionate injections may also cause an increased risk of thromboembolism, changes in blood lipid profile, increased insulin resistance, and increased levels of prolactin.

== Overdose ==
Symptoms of estrogen overdosage may include nausea, vomiting, bloating, increased weight, water retention, breast tenderness, vaginal discharge, heavy legs, and leg cramps. These side effects can be diminished by reducing the estrogen dosage.

== Interactions ==
Inhibitors and inducers of cytochrome P450 may influence the metabolism of estradiol and by extension circulating estradiol levels.

== Pharmacology ==
Estradiol, the active form of estradiol cypionate.

=== Pharmacodynamics ===
Estradiol cypionate is an estradiol ester, or a prodrug of estradiol. As such, it is an estrogen, or an agonist of the estrogen receptors. The affinity of estradiol valerate for the estrogen receptor has been reported to be 50 times less than that of estradiol, and estradiol valerate and estradiol cypionate have been found to possess similar affinity for the estrogen receptor. Both estradiol cypionate and estradiol valerate are rapidly cleaved into estradiol in the body, and estradiol valerate has been found to be unable to reach target tissues in any concentration of significance. As such, estradiol valerate is regarded as essentially inactive in terms of estrogenic effect itself, acting solely as a prodrug to estradiol, and estradiol cypionate is described as a prodrug of estradiol similarly. Estradiol cypionate is of about 46% higher molecular weight than estradiol due to the presence of its C17β cypionate ester, and contains about 69% of the amount of estradiol by weight. Because estradiol cypionate is a prodrug of estradiol, it is considered to be a natural and bioidentical form of estrogen.

Affinities and estrogenic potencies of estrogen esters and ethers at the estrogen receptors
Estrogen	Other names	RBA (%)^{a}	REP (%)^{b}	
Estrogen	Other names	ER	ERα	ERβ
Estradiol	E2	100	100	100
Estradiol 3-sulfate	E2S; E2-3S	?	0.02	0.04
Estradiol 3-glucuronide	E2-3G	?	0.02	0.09
Estradiol 17β-glucuronide	E2-17G	?	0.002	0.0002
Estradiol benzoate	EB; Estradiol 3-benzoate	10	1.1	0.52
Estradiol 17β-acetate	E2-17A	31–45	24	?
Estradiol diacetate	EDA; Estradiol 3,17β-diacetate	?	0.79	?
Estradiol propionate	EP; Estradiol 17β-propionate	19–26	2.6	?
Estradiol valerate	EV; Estradiol 17β-valerate	2–11	0.04–21	?
Estradiol cypionate	EC; Estradiol 17β-cypionate	?^{c}	4.0	?
Estradiol palmitate	Estradiol 17β-palmitate	0	?	?
Estradiol stearate	Estradiol 17β-stearate	0	?	?
Estrone	E1; 17-Ketoestradiol	11	5.3–38	14
Estrone sulfate	E1S; Estrone 3-sulfate	2	0.004	0.002
Estrone glucuronide	E1G; Estrone 3-glucuronide	?	<0.001	0.0006
Ethinylestradiol	EE; 17α-Ethynylestradiol	100	17–150	129
Mestranol	EE 3-methyl ether	1	1.3–8.2	0.16
Quinestrol	EE 3-cyclopentyl ether	?	0.37	?
Footnotes: ^{a} = Relative binding affinities (RBAs) were determined via in-vitro displacement of labeled estradiol from estrogen receptors (ERs) generally of rodent uterine cytosol. Estrogen esters are variably hydrolyzed into estrogens in these systems (shorter ester chain length -> greater rate of hydrolysis) and the ER RBAs of the esters decrease strongly when hydrolysis is prevented. ^{b} = Relative estrogenic potencies (REPs) were calculated from half-maximal effective concentrations (EC_{50}) that were determined via in-vitro β‐galactosidase (β-gal) and green fluorescent protein (GFP) production assays in yeast expressing human ERα and human ERβ. Both mammalian cells and yeast have the capacity to hydrolyze estrogen esters. ^{c} = The affinities of estradiol cypionate for the ERs are similar to those of estradiol valerate and estradiol benzoate (figure). Sources: See template page.

Potencies and durations of natural estrogens by intramuscular injection
Estrogen	Form	Dose (mg)		Duration by dose (mg)
Estrogen	Form	EPD	CICD	Duration by dose (mg)
Estradiol	Aq. soln.	?	–	<1 d
Estradiol	Oil soln.	40–60	–	1–2 ≈ 1–2 d
Estradiol	Aq. susp.	?	3.5	0.5–2 ≈ 2–7 d; 3.5 ≈ >5 d
Estradiol	Microsph.	?	–	1 ≈ 30 d
Estradiol benzoate	Oil soln.	25–35	–	1.66 ≈ 2–3 d; 5 ≈ 3–6 d
Estradiol benzoate	Aq. susp.	20	–	10 ≈ 16–21 d
Estradiol benzoate	Emulsion	?	–	10 ≈ 14–21 d
Estradiol dipropionate	Oil soln.	25–30	–	5 ≈ 5–8 d
Estradiol valerate	Oil soln.	20–30	5	5 ≈ 7–8 d; 10 ≈ 10–14 d; 40 ≈ 14–21 d; 100 ≈ 21–28 d
Estradiol benz. butyrate	Oil soln.	?	10	10 ≈ 21 d
Estradiol cypionate	Oil soln.	20–30	–	5 ≈ 11–14 d
Estradiol cypionate	Aq. susp.	?	5	5 ≈ 14–24 d
Estradiol enanthate	Oil soln.	?	5–10	10 ≈ 20–30 d
Estradiol dienanthate	Oil soln.	?	–	7.5 ≈ >40 d
Estradiol undecylate	Oil soln.	?	–	10–20 ≈ 40–60 d; 25–50 ≈ 60–120 d
Polyestradiol phosphate	Aq. soln.	40–60	–	40 ≈ 30 d; 80 ≈ 60 d; 160 ≈ 120 d
Estrone	Oil soln.	?	–	1–2 ≈ 2–3 d
Estrone	Aq. susp.	?	–	0.1–2 ≈ 2–7 d
Estriol	Oil soln.	?	–	1–2 ≈ 1–4 d
Polyestriol phosphate	Aq. soln.	?	–	50 ≈ 30 d; 80 ≈ 60 d
Notes and sources Notes: All aqueous suspensions are of microcrystalline particle size. Estradiol production during the menstrual cycle is 30–640 µg/d (6.4–8.6 mg total per month or cycle). The vaginal epithelium maturation dosage of estradiol benzoate or estradiol valerate has been reported as 5 to 7 mg/week. An effective ovulation-inhibiting dose of estradiol undecylate is 20–30 mg/month. Sources: See template.

==== Effects on liver protein synthesis ====
A study compared the combination of 5 mg estradiol cypionate and 25 mg medroxyprogesterone acetate as a combined injectable contraceptive (which has been associated with peak estradiol levels of around 300 pg/mL) with an ethinylestradiol-containing combined birth control pill and found that whereas the birth control pill produced significant changes in coagulation parameters, there were no significant prothrombotic effects of the combined injectable contraceptive on levels of fibrinogen, factors VII and X, plasminogen, or the activated prothrombin time. As such, it appears that similarly to depot medroxyprogesterone acetate, combined injectable contraceptives with 5 mg estradiol cypionate and 25 mg medroxyprogesterone acetate have less or no procoagulant effect relative to combined birth control pills.

=== Pharmacokinetics ===
==== Intramuscular injection ====
In contrast to oral administration, which is associated with very low bioavailability (<10%), the bioavailability of both estradiol and estradiol esters like estradiol valerate is complete (i.e., 100%) via intramuscular injection. In addition, estradiol esters like estradiol cypionate and estradiol valerate when given as an injection of oil solution or microcrystalline aqueous suspension have a relatively long duration due to the formation of an intramuscular depot from which they are slowly released and absorbed. Upon intramuscular injection of estradiol cypionate in an oil solution, the solvent (i.e., oil) is absorbed, and a primary microcrystalline depot is formed within the muscle at the site of injection. In addition, a secondary depot may be formed in adipose tissue. The slow release of estradiol cypionate from the tissue depot is caused by the high lipophilicity of the estradiol ester, which in turn is due to its long fatty acid cypionic acid ester moiety. Estradiol cypionate is formulated for use alone and in combination with testosterone cypionate as an oil solution, and for use in combination with medroxyprogesterone acetate as a microcrystalline aqueous suspension. Aqueous suspensions of steroid esters generally have longer durations by intramuscular injection than oil solutions.

A single intramuscular injection of 5 mg estradiol cypionate has been found to result in peak circulating concentrations of 338 pg/mL estradiol and 145 pg/mL estrone, which occurred at about 4 and 5 days post-injection, respectively (see right table). Compared to two other commonly used estradiol esters (which were also assessed in the study), estradiol cypionate had the longest duration, at approximately 11 days, whereas estradiol benzoate and estradiol valerate were found to last for 4 to 5 days and 7 to 8 days, respectively. This is because estradiol cypionate has a more extensive fatty acid chain and in relation to this is comparatively more lipophilic. For a given estradiol ester, the longer or more extensive the fatty acid chain is, the more lipophilic, longer-lasting, and more uniform/plateau-like the resultant levels of estradiol are as well as the lower the peak/maximal levels are (and hence less spike-like).

Estradiol cypionate/medroxyprogesterone acetate (brand names Lunelle, Cyclofem) is a combined injectable contraceptive containing 5 mg estradiol cypionate and 25 mg medroxyprogesterone acetate in microcrystalline aqueous suspension for once-monthly intramuscular administration. With this formulations, estradiol levels peak 2 to 3 days post-injection with average maximal circulating levels of about 250 pg/mL. The elimination half-life of estradiol with these formulations is 8.4 to 10.1 days, and circulating estradiol levels return to a baseline of about 50 pg/mL approximately 14 to 24 days post-injection.

Hormone levels with estradiol cypionate by intramuscular injection
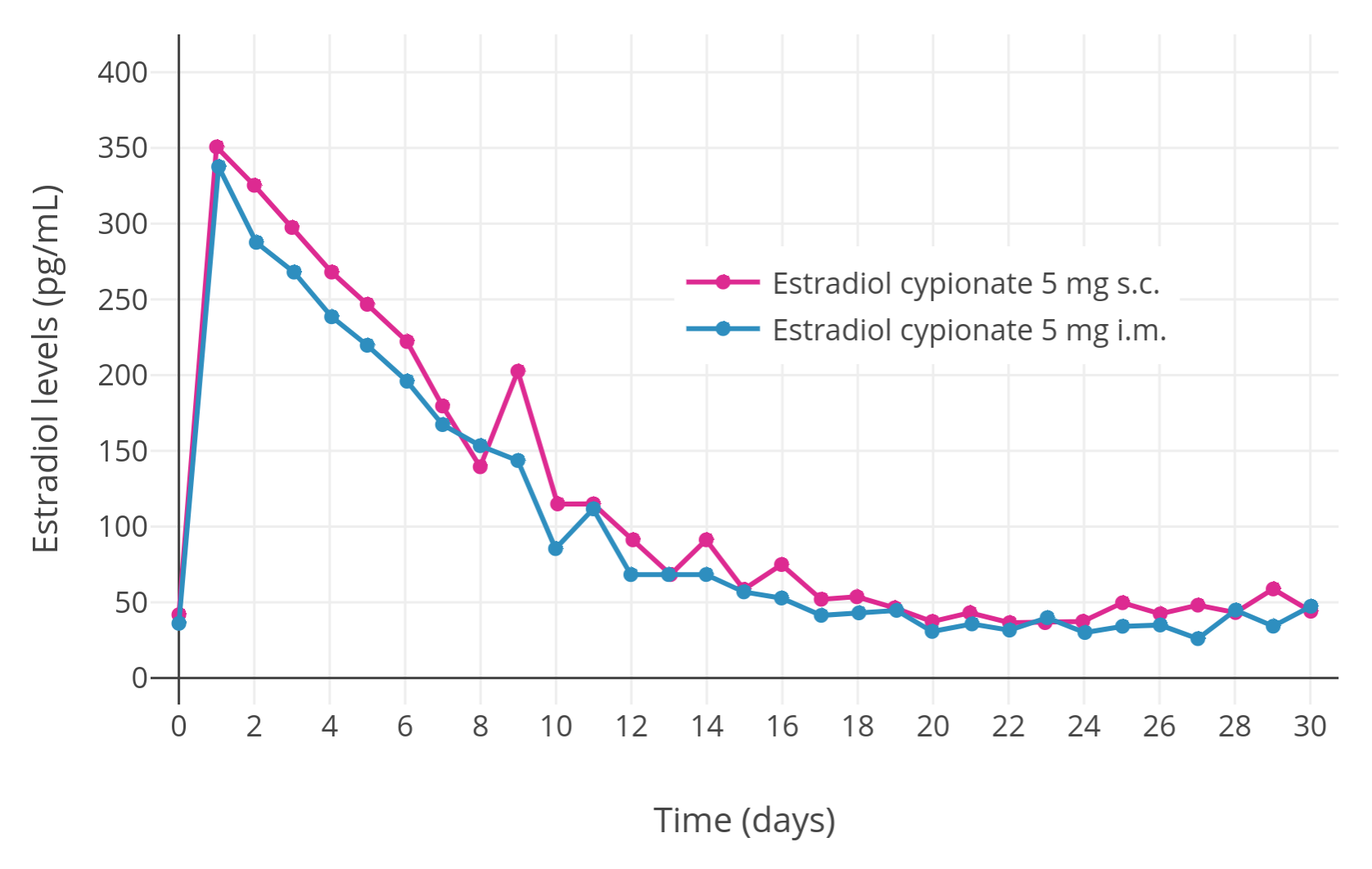
Estradiol levels after subcutaneous (s.c.) or intramuscular (i.m.) injection of 5 mg estradiol cypionate in aqueous suspension. Assays were performed using enzyme immunoassay. Source was Sierra-Ramírez et al. (2011).

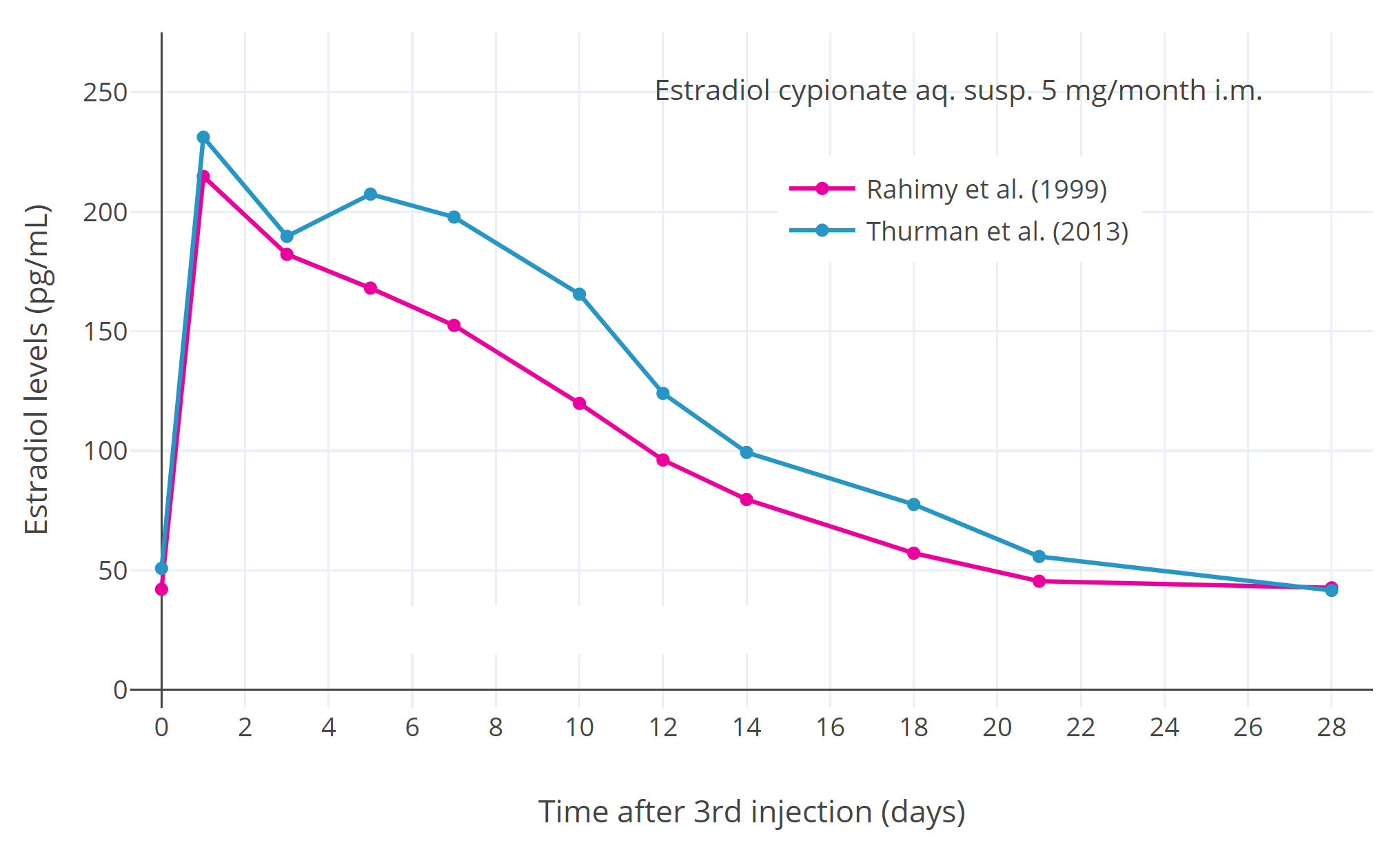
Estradiol levels at steady state (after the 3rd injection) with intramuscular injections of aqueous suspensions of 5 mg estradiol cypionate per month in premenopausal women. Assays were performed using enzyme immunoassay and LC-MS/MS. Sources were Rahimy et al. (1999) and Thurman et al. (2013).

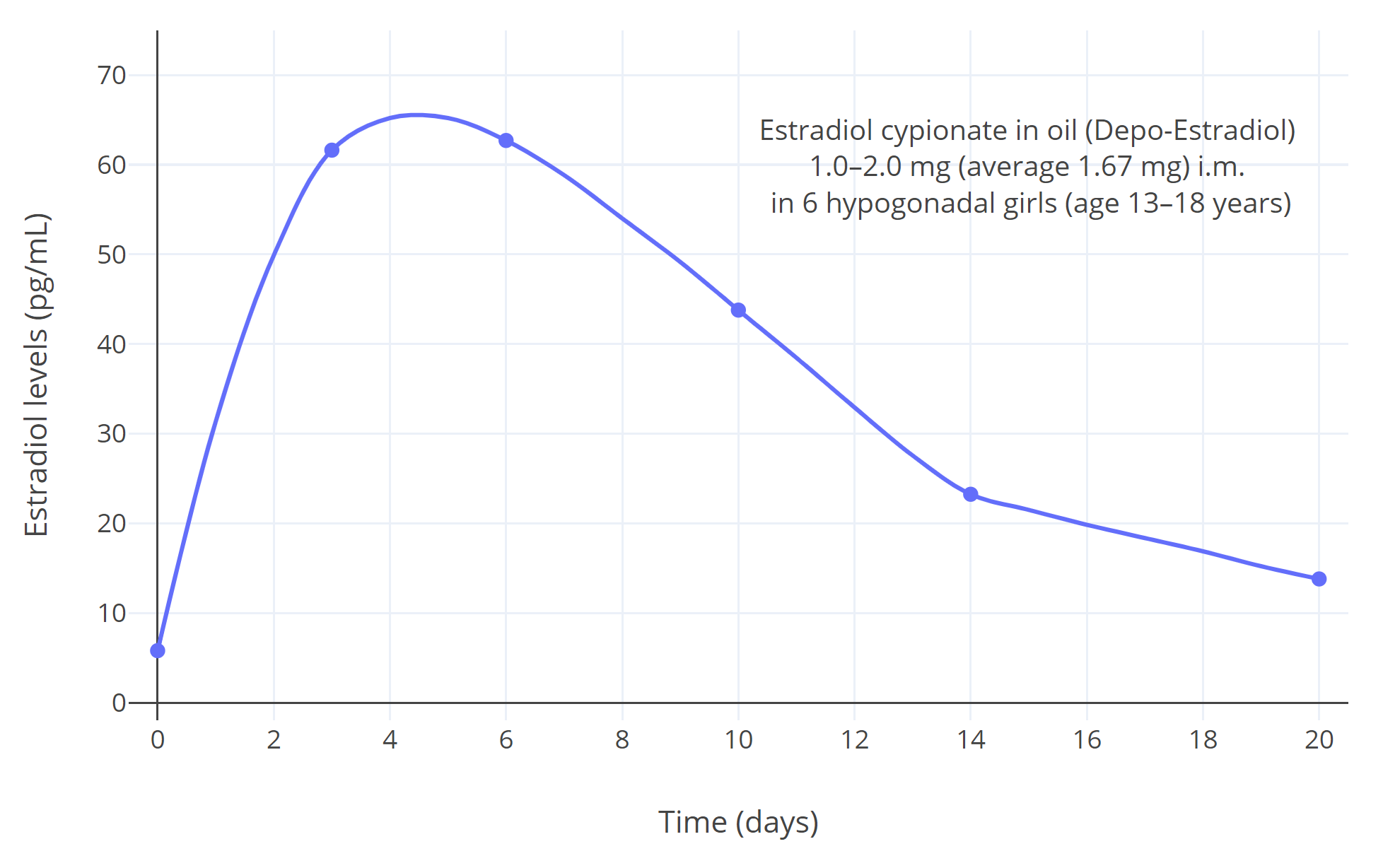
Estradiol levels after a single intramuscular injection of 1.0 to 2.0 mg (average 1.67 mg) of estradiol cypionate in oil (Depo-Estradiol) in hypogonadal girls. Assays were performed using radioimmunoassay with chromatographic separation. Sources were Rosenfield et al. (1973, 1974).

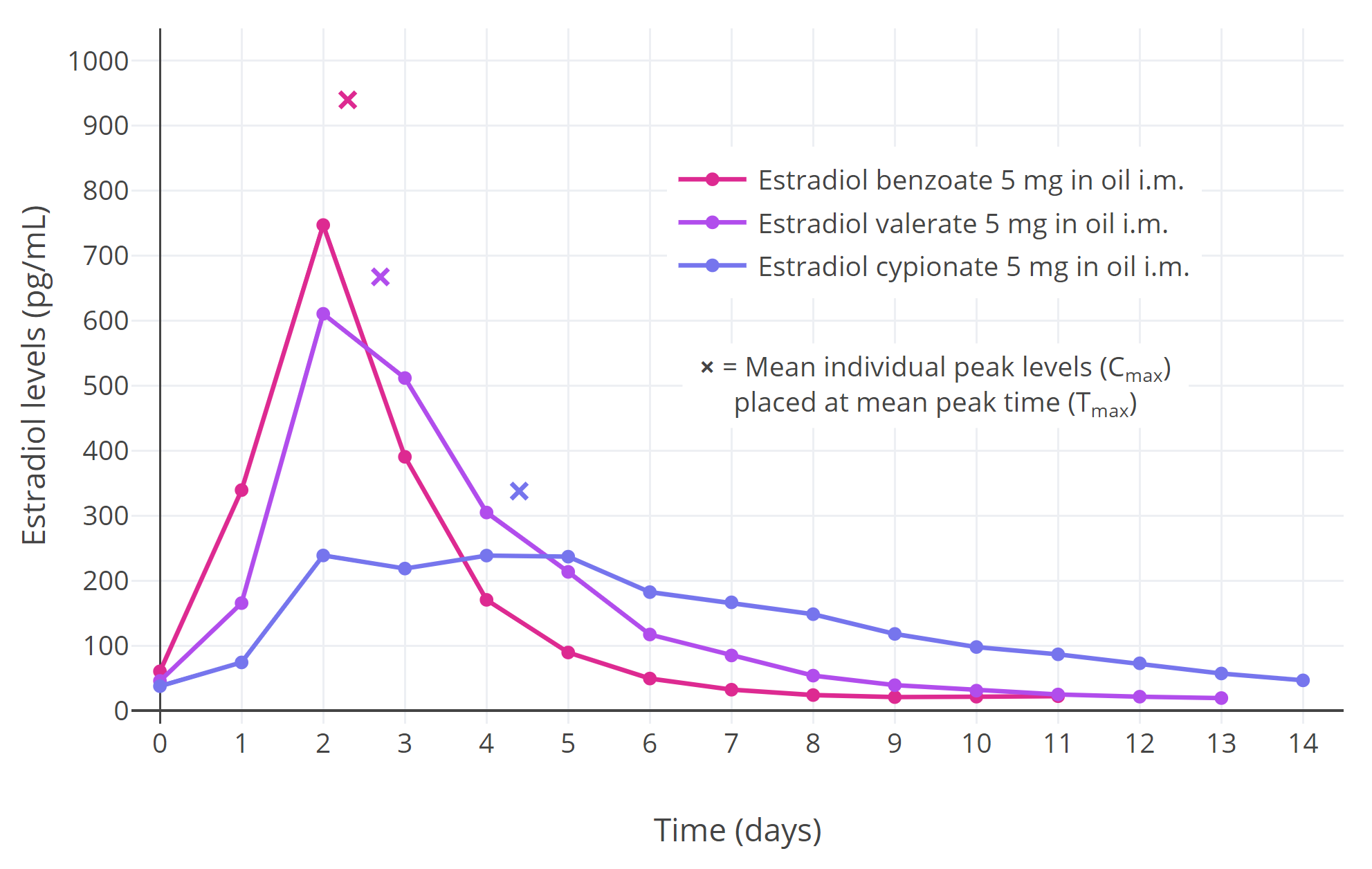
Estradiol levels after single intramuscular injections of 5 mg of different estradiol esters in oil in premenopausal women. Assays were performed using radioimmunoassay with chromatographic separation. Source was Oriowo et al. (1980).

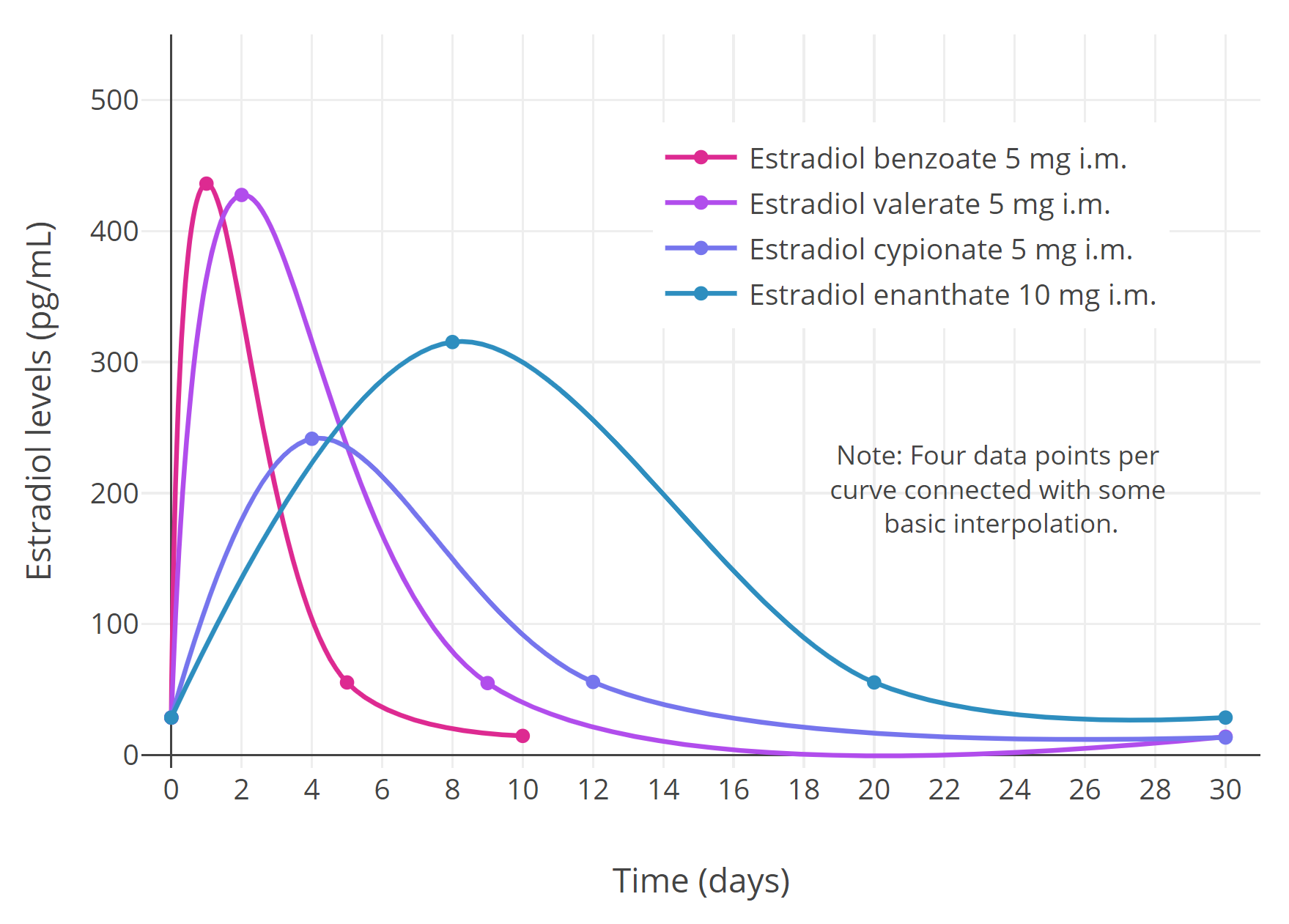
Simplified curves of estradiol levels after injection of different estradiol esters in oil solution in women. Source was Garza-Flores (1994).

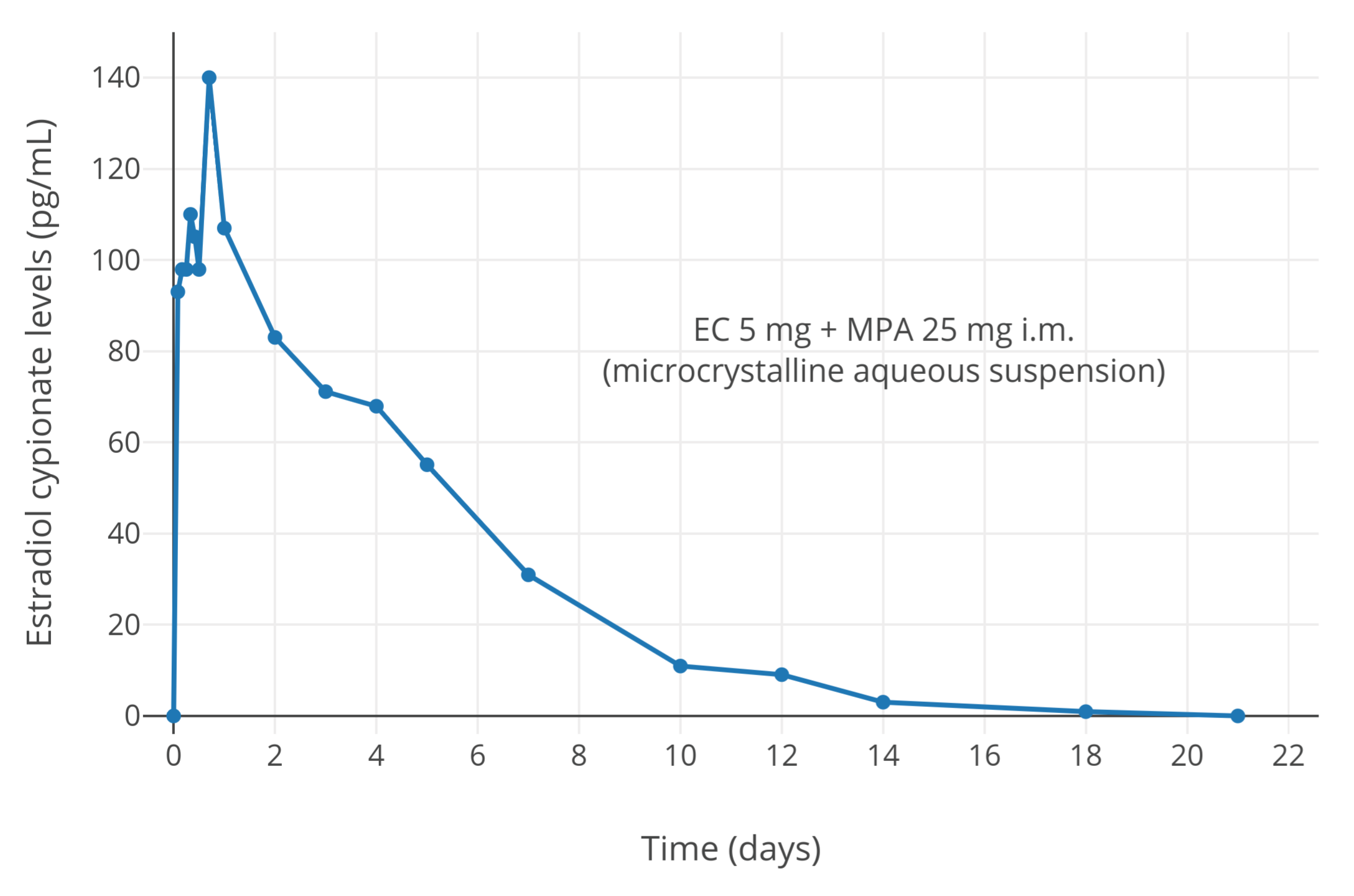
Estradiol cypionate levels after a single injection of 5 mg microcrystalline estradiol cypionate in aqueous suspension in women. Assays were performed using LC-MS/MS. Source was Martins et al. (2019).

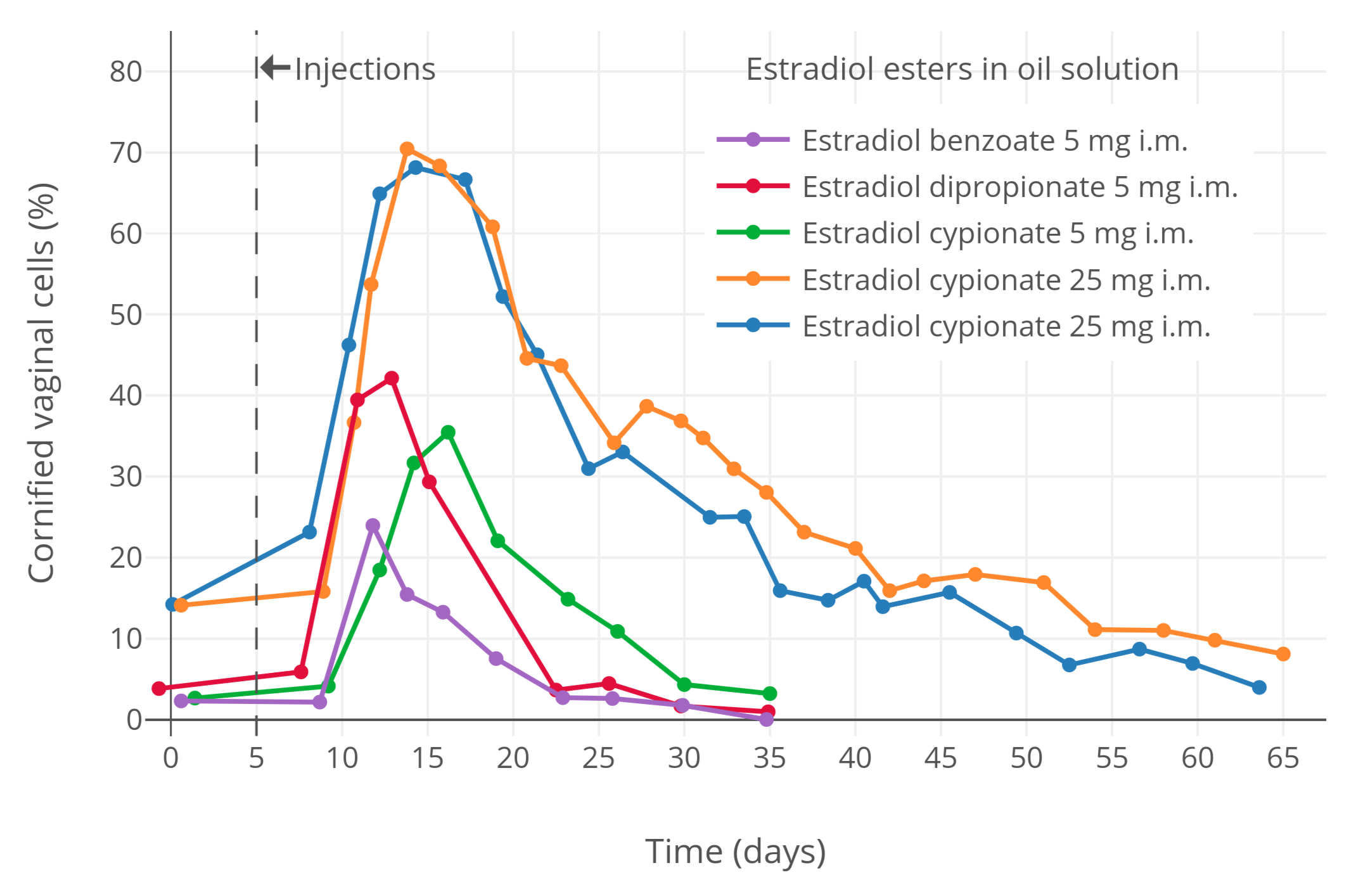
Vaginal cornification with a single intramuscular injection of different estradiol esters in oil solution in women. Source was Schwartz & Soule (1955).

==== Subcutaneous injection ====
Estradiol cypionate in a microcrystalline aqueous suspension has been found to have equivalent effectiveness and virtually identical pharmacokinetics when administered by subcutaneous injection versus intramuscular injection. However, subcutaneous injection is considered to be easier and less painful relative to intramuscular injection, and for these reasons, may result in comparatively greater satisfaction and compliance.

== Chemistry ==
Estradiol cypionate is a synthetic estrane steroid and the C17β cyclopentylpropionate (cypionate) fatty acid ester of estradiol. It is also known as estra-1,3,5(10)-triene-3,17β-diol 17β-cyclopentylpropionate. Other common esters of estradiol in use include estradiol valerate, estradiol enantate, and estradiol acetate, the former two of which are C17β esters of estradiol similarly to estradiol cypionate and the latter of which is the C3 acetate ester of estradiol.

The experimental octanol/water partition coefficient (logP) of estradiol cypionate is 6.9.

Structural properties of selected estradiol esters
Estrogen	Structure	Ester(s)				Relative mol. weight	Relative E2 content^{b}	log P^{c}
Estrogen	Structure	Position(s)	Moiet(ies)	Type	Length^{a}	Relative mol. weight	Relative E2 content^{b}	log P^{c}
Estradiol		–	–	–	–	1.00	1.00	4.0
Estradiol acetate		C3	Ethanoic acid	Straight-chain fatty acid	2	1.15	0.87	4.2
Estradiol benzoate		C3	Benzoic acid	Aromatic fatty acid	– (~4–5)	1.38	0.72	4.7
Estradiol dipropionate		C3, C17β	Propanoic acid (×2)	Straight-chain fatty acid	3 (×2)	1.41	0.71	4.9
Estradiol valerate		C17β	Pentanoic acid	Straight-chain fatty acid	5	1.31	0.76	5.6–6.3
Estradiol benzoate butyrate		C3, C17β	Benzoic acid, butyric acid	Mixed fatty acid	– (~6, 2)	1.64	0.61	6.3
Estradiol cypionate		C17β	Cyclopentylpropanoic acid	Cyclic fatty acid	– (~6)	1.46	0.69	6.9
Estradiol enanthate		C17β	Heptanoic acid	Straight-chain fatty acid	7	1.41	0.71	6.7–7.3
Estradiol dienanthate		C3, C17β	Heptanoic acid (×2)	Straight-chain fatty acid	7 (×2)	1.82	0.55	8.1–10.4
Estradiol undecylate		C17β	Undecanoic acid	Straight-chain fatty acid	11	1.62	0.62	9.2–9.8
Estradiol stearate		C17β	Octadecanoic acid	Straight-chain fatty acid	18	1.98	0.51	12.2–12.4
Estradiol distearate		C3, C17β	Octadecanoic acid (×2)	Straight-chain fatty acid	18 (×2)	2.96	0.34	20.2
Estradiol sulfate		C3	Sulfuric acid	Water-soluble conjugate	–	1.29	0.77	0.3–3.8
Estradiol glucuronide		C17β	Glucuronic acid	Water-soluble conjugate	–	1.65	0.61	2.1–2.7
Estramustine phosphate^{d}		C3, C17β	Normustine, phosphoric acid	Water-soluble conjugate	–	1.91	0.52	2.9–5.0
Polyestradiol phosphate^{e}		C3–C17β	Phosphoric acid	Water-soluble conjugate	–	1.23^{f}	0.81^{f}	2.9^{g}
Footnotes: ^{a} = Length of ester in carbon atoms for straight-chain fatty acids or approximate length of ester in carbon atoms for aromatic or cyclic fatty acids. ^{b} = Relative estradiol content by weight (i.e., relative estrogenic exposure). ^{c} = Experimental or predicted octanol/water partition coefficient (i.e., lipophilicity/hydrophobicity). Retrieved from PubChem, ChemSpider, and DrugBank. ^{d} = Also known as estradiol normustine phosphate. ^{e} = Polymer of estradiol phosphate (~13 repeat units). ^{f} = Relative molecular weight or estradiol content per repeat unit. ^{g} = log P of repeat unit (i.e., estradiol phosphate). Sources: See individual articles.

== History ==
Estradiol cypionate was patented by Upjohn in 1952, with a priority date of 1951. It was first introduced for medical use by Upjohn in 1952 under the brand name Depo-Estradiol in the United States. Subsequently, it was also marketed in other countries such as European countries and Japan. The first clinical reports of estradiol cypionate were published in 1952 and thereafter. It was initially known as estradiol cyclopentylpropionate (ECP), and did not become known as estradiol cypionate until over a decade later in the mid-to-late 1960s. Along with estradiol valerate (1954) and estradiol benzoate (1933), estradiol cypionate has become one of the most commonly used esters of estradiol.

When estradiol cypionate was to be combined with medroxyprogesterone acetate as a once-a-month injectable contraceptive, there was a problem in that estradiol cypionate was prepared as an oil solution while medroxyprogesterone acetate was used as a microcrystalline aqueous suspension. This issue was resolved by switching to a microcrystalline aqueous suspension in the case of estradiol cypionate, allowing it to be combined with medroxyprogesterone acetate in a single suspension. As a result, single-drug preparations of estradiol cypionate are oil solutions, while the combination of estradiol cypionate and medroxyprogesterone acetate are microcrystalline aqueous suspensions.

== Society and culture ==
=== Generic names ===
Estradiol cypionate is the generic name of the drug and its INN and USAN. It is also known as estradiol cyclopentylpropionate (ECP).

=== Brand names ===
Estradiol cypionate has been marketed under the brand names Cicloestradiolo, D-Est, depGynogen, Depo-Estradiol, Depoestra, Depofemin, Depogen, Dura-Estrin, E-Cypionate, E-Ionate, Estradep, Estro-Cyp, Estrofem, Estroject, Estromed-PA, Estronol, Femovirin, Neoginon Depositum, Oestradiol-Retard, Pertradiol, Spendepiol, and T-E Cypionate, among others.

=== Availability ===
Estradiol cypionate is available in the United States. It was previously marketed in Spain and Italy, but was discontinued in these countries and is no longer available in Europe. Estradiol cypionate has mostly been used in the United States, similarly to testosterone cypionate, with both of these medications having been developed by Upjohn, an American pharmaceutical company. Besides the United States, estradiol cypionate has been marketed in France, Germany, Italy, Spain, and Japan, among other countries. Estradiol cypionate for human use is not available in Canada, although it is marketed in several veterinary formulations in this country.

Estradiol cypionate is available in Taiwan in combination with testosterone cypionate. It is also available as a combined injectable contraceptive in combination with medroxyprogesterone acetate in at least 18 countries, mostly in Latin America and Southeast Asia. Estradiol cypionate/testosterone cypionate and estradiol cypionate/medroxyprogesterone acetate were both formerly marketed in the United States, but have been discontinued in this country.

== See also ==
- Estradiol cypionate/medroxyprogesterone acetate
- Estradiol cypionate/testosterone cypionate
