= Estradiol (medication) =

Steroidal hormone medication

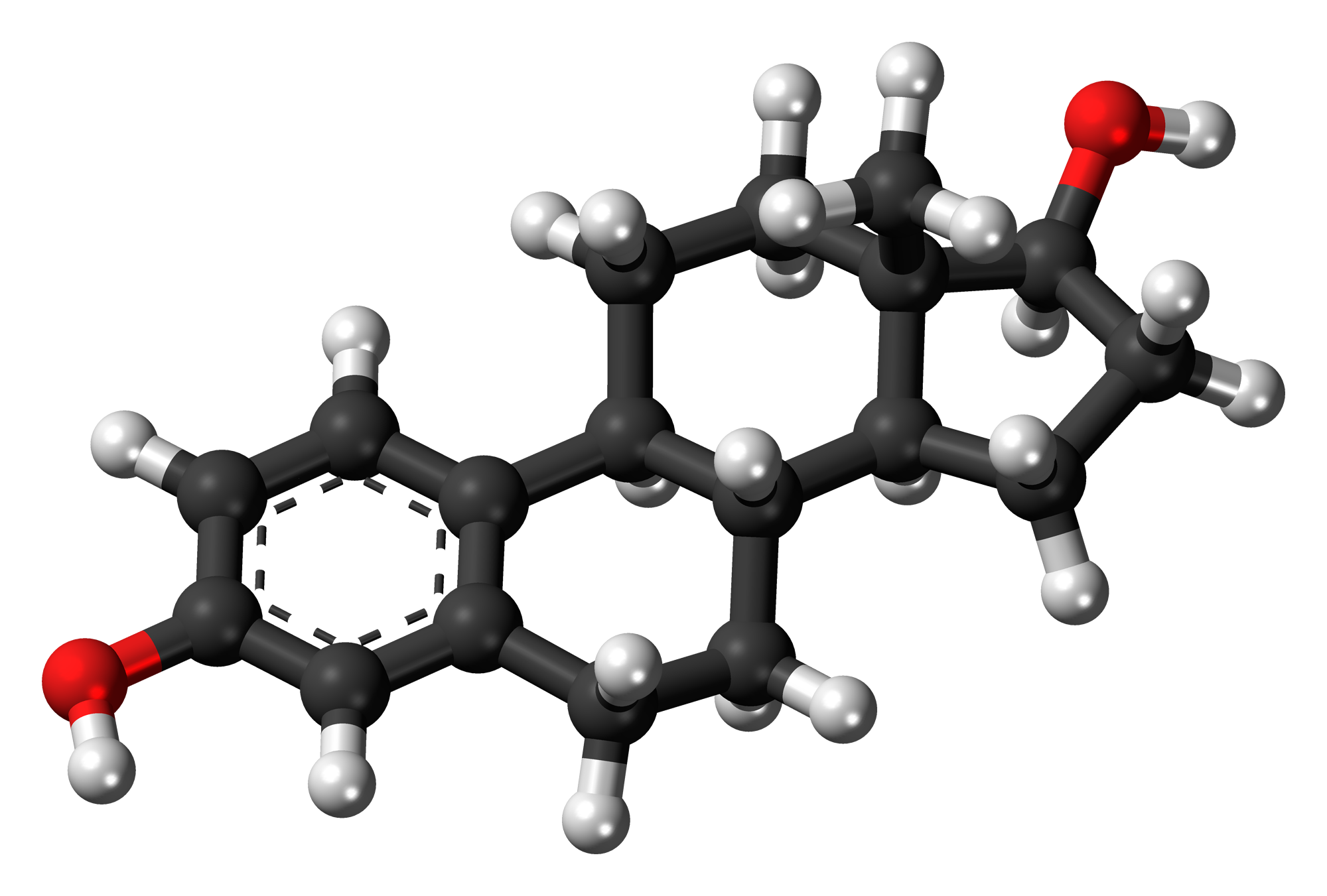

Clinical data
- Pronunciation: /ˌɛstrəˈdaɪoʊl/ ES-trə-DY-ohl
- Trade names: Many
- Other names: Oestradiol; E2; 17β-Estradiol; Estra-1,3,5(10)-triene-3,17β-diol
- AHFS/Drugs.com: Monograph
- License data: US DailyMed: Estradiol
- Pregnancy category: AU: B1
- Routes of administration: By mouth (tablet) • Sublingual (tablet) • Intranasal (nasal spray) • Transdermal (patch, gel, cream, emulsion, spray) • Vaginal (tablet, cream, suppository, insert, ring) • IM injection (oil solution) • SC injection (aq. soln.) • Subcutaneous implant
- Drug class: Estrogen
- ATC code: G03CA03 (WHO)

Legal status
- Legal status: AU: S4 (Prescription only); CA: ℞-only; UK: POM (Prescription only); US: ℞-only; EU: Varies; In general: ℞ (Prescription only)

Pharmacokinetic data
- Bioavailability: Oral: <5% IM: 100%
- Protein binding: ~98%: • Albumin: 60% • SHBG: 38% • Free: 2%
- Metabolism: Liver (via hydroxylation, sulfation, glucuronidation)
- Metabolites: Major (90%): • Estrone • Estrone sulfate • Estrone glucuronide • Estradiol glucuronide
- Elimination half-life: Oral: 13–20 hours Sublingual: 8–18 hours Transdermal (gel): 37 hours IM (as EV): 4–5 days IM (as EC): 8–10 days IV (as E2): 1–2 hours
- Excretion: Urine: 54% Feces: 6%

Identifiers
- IUPAC name: (8R,9S,13S,14S,17S)-13-methyl-6,7,8,9,11,12,14,15,16,17-decahydrocyclopenta[a]phenanthrene-3,17-diol
- CAS Number: 50-28-2
- PubChem CID: 5757
- IUPHAR/BPS: 1013
- DrugBank: DB00783
- ChemSpider: 5554
- UNII: 4TI98Z838E
- KEGG: D00105
- ChEBI: CHEBI:16469
- ChEMBL: ChEMBL135

Chemical and physical data
- Formula: C_{18}H_{24}O_{2}
- Molar mass: 272.388 g·mol^{−1}
- 3D model (JSmol): Interactive image
- SMILES: C[C@]12CC[C@H]3[C@H]([C@@H]1CC[C@@H]2O)CCC4=C3C=CC(=C4)O
- InChI: InChI=1S/C18H24O2/c1-18-9-8-14-13-5-3-12(19)10-11(13)2-4-15(14)16(18)6-7-17(18)20/h3,5,10,14-17,19-20H,2,4,6-9H2,1H3/t14-,15-,16+,17+,18+/m1/s1; Key:VOXZDWNPVJITMN-ZBRFXRBCSA-N

Estradiol (E2) is a medication and naturally occurring steroid hormone. It is an estrogen and is used mainly in menopausal hormone therapy and to treat low sex hormone levels in women. It is also used in hormonal birth control for women, in feminizing hormone therapy for transgender women and some non-binary individuals, and in the treatment of hormone-sensitive cancers like prostate cancer in men and breast cancer in women, among other uses. Estradiol can be taken by mouth, held and dissolved under the tongue, as a gel or patch that is applied to the skin, in through the vagina, by injection into muscle or fat, or through the use of an implant that is placed into fat, among other routes.

Side effects of estradiol in women include breast tenderness, breast enlargement, headache, fluid retention, and nausea among others. Men and children who are exposed to estradiol may develop symptoms of feminization, such as breast development and a feminine pattern of fat distribution, and men may also experience low testosterone levels and infertility. Estradiol may increase the risk of endometrial hyperplasia and endometrial cancer in women with intact uteruses if it is not taken together with a progestogen such as progesterone. The combination of estradiol with a progestin, though not with oral progesterone, may increase the risk of breast cancer. Estradiol should not be used in women who are pregnant or breastfeeding or who have breast cancer, among other contraindications.

Estradiol is a naturally occurring and bioidentical estrogen, or an agonist of the estrogen receptor, the biological target of estrogens like endogenous estradiol. Due to its estrogenic activity, estradiol has antigonadotropic effects and can inhibit fertility and suppress sex hormone production in both women and men. Estradiol differs from non-bioidentical estrogens like conjugated estrogens and ethinylestradiol in various ways, with implications for tolerability and safety.

Estradiol was discovered in 1933. It became available as a medication that same year, in an injectable form known as estradiol benzoate. Forms that were more useful by mouth, estradiol valerate and micronized estradiol, were introduced in the 1960s and 1970s and increased its popularity by this route. Estradiol is also used as other prodrugs, like estradiol cypionate. Related estrogens such as ethinylestradiol, which is the most common estrogen in birth control pills, and conjugated estrogens (brand name Premarin), which is used in menopausal hormone therapy, are used as medications as well. In 2023, it was the 56th most commonly prescribed medication in the United States, with more than 11 million prescriptions. It is available as a generic medication.

== Medical uses ==
=== Hormone therapy ===
==== Menopause ====
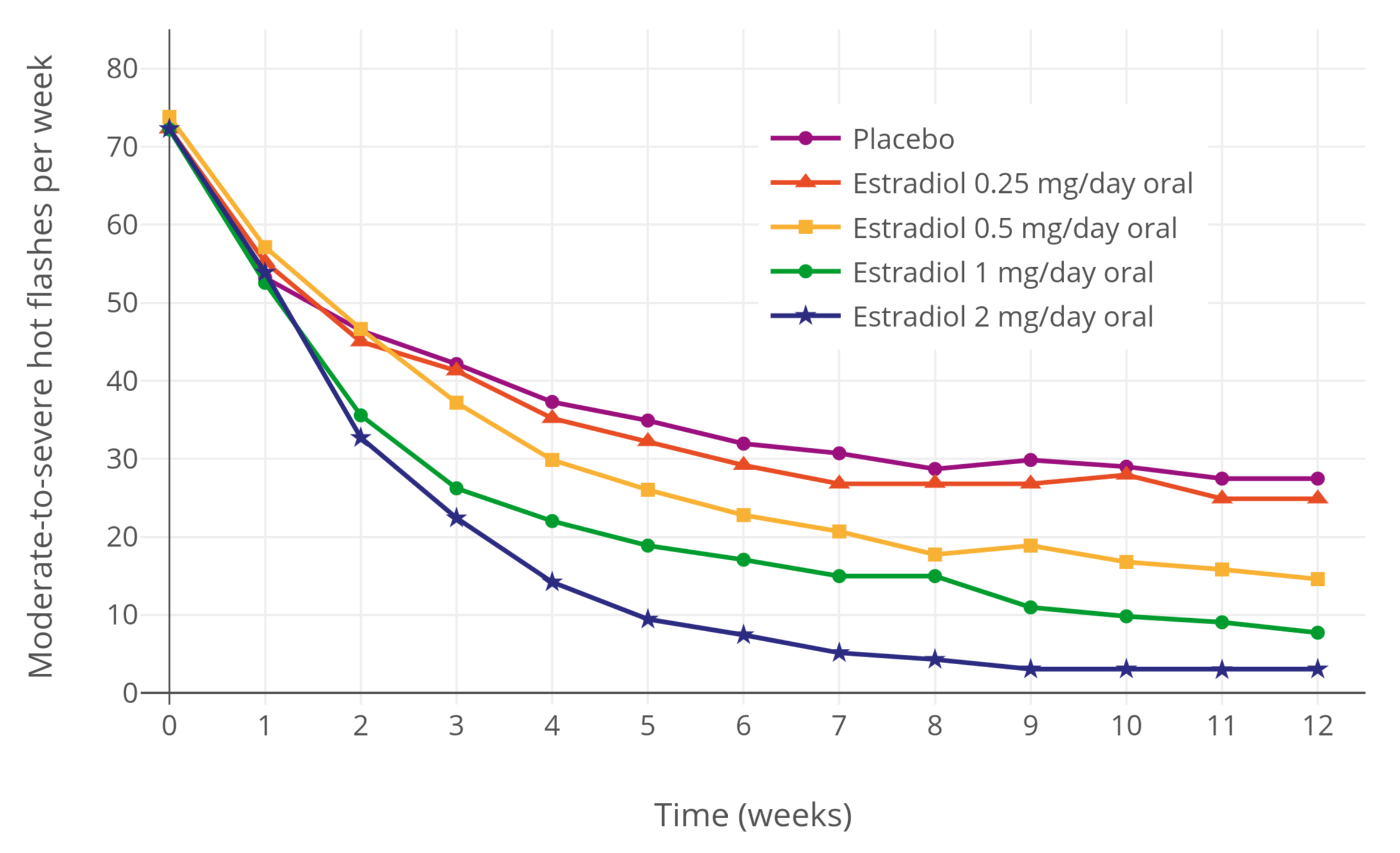
Average number of moderate-to-severe hot flashes per week with placebo and different doses of oral estradiol in menopausal women

Estradiol is used in menopausal hormone therapy to prevent and treat moderate to severe menopausal symptoms such as hot flashes, vaginal dryness and atrophy, and osteoporosis (bone loss). As unopposed estrogen therapy (using estrogen alone without progesterone) increases the risk of endometrial hyperplasia and endometrial cancer in women with intact uteruses, estradiol is usually combined with a progestogen like progesterone or medroxyprogesterone acetate to prevent the effects of estradiol on the endometrium. This is not necessary if the woman has undergone a hysterectomy (surgical removal of the uterus). A 2017 meta-analysis found that estradiol had no effect on depressive symptoms in peri- and postmenopausal women.

Estrogen dosages for menopausal hormone therapy
| Route/form | Estrogen | Low | Standard | High |
|---|---|---|---|---|
| Oral | Estradiol | 0.5–1 mg/day | 1–2 mg/day | 2–4 mg/day |
| Oral | Estradiol valerate | 0.5–1 mg/day | 1–2 mg/day | 2–4 mg/day |
| Oral | Estradiol acetate | 0.45–0.9 mg/day | 0.9–1.8 mg/day | 1.8–3.6 mg/day |
| Oral | Conjugated estrogens | 0.3–0.45 mg/day | 0.625 mg/day | 0.9–1.25 mg/day |
| Oral | Esterified estrogens | 0.3–0.45 mg/day | 0.625 mg/day | 0.9–1.25 mg/day |
| Oral | Estropipate | 0.75 mg/day | 1.5 mg/day | 3 mg/day |
| Oral | Estriol | 1–2 mg/day | 2–4 mg/day | 4–8 mg/day |
| Oral | Ethinylestradiol^{a} | 2.5–10 μg/day | 5–20 μg/day | – |
| Nasal spray | Estradiol | 150 μg/day | 300 μg/day | 600 μg/day |
| Transdermal patch | Estradiol | 25 μg/day^{b} | 50 μg/day^{b} | 100 μg/day^{b} |
| Transdermal gel | Estradiol | 0.5 mg/day | 1–1.5 mg/day | 2–3 mg/day |
| Vaginal | Estradiol | 25 μg/day | – | – |
| Vaginal | Estriol | 30 μg/day | 0.5 mg 2x/week | 0.5 mg/day |
| IM or SC injection | Estradiol valerate | – | – | 4 mg 1x/4 weeks |
| IM or SC injection | Estradiol cypionate | 1 mg 1x/3–4 weeks | 3 mg 1x/3–4 weeks | 5 mg 1x/3–4 weeks |
| IM or SC injection | Estradiol benzoate | 0.5 mg 1x/week | 1 mg 1x/week | 1.5 mg 1x/week |
| SC implant | Estradiol | 25 mg 1x/6 months | 50 mg 1x/6 months | 100 mg 1x/6 months |
Footnotes: ^{a} = No longer used or recommended, due to health concerns. ^{b} = As a single patch applied once or twice per week (worn for 3–4 days or 7 days), depending on the formulation. Note: Dosages are not necessarily equivalent. Sources: See template.

==== Hypogonadism ====
Estrogen is responsible for the mediation of puberty in females, and in girls with delayed puberty due to hypogonadism (low-functioning gonads, which can result in low sex hormone levels) such as in Turner syndrome, estradiol is used to induce the development of and maintain female secondary sexual characteristics such as breasts, wide hips, and a female fat distribution. It is also used to restore estradiol levels in adult premenopausal women with hypogonadism, for instance those with premature ovarian failure or who have undergone oophorectomy. It is used to treat women with hypogonadism due to hypopituitarism as well.

==== Transgender women ====
Estradiol is used as part of feminizing hormone therapy for transgender women and some non-binary individuals. The drug is used in higher dosages prior to gender-affirming surgery or orchiectomy to help suppress testosterone levels; after this procedure, estradiol continues to be used at lower dosages to maintain estradiol levels in the normal premenopausal female range.

=== Birth control ===
Although almost all combined oral contraceptives contain the synthetic estrogen ethinylestradiol, natural estradiol itself is also used in some hormonal contraceptives, including in estradiol-containing oral contraceptives and combined injectable contraceptives. It is formulated in combination with a progestin such as dienogest, nomegestrol acetate, or medroxyprogesterone acetate, and is often used in the form of an ester prodrug like estradiol valerate or estradiol cypionate. Hormonal contraceptives contain a progestin and/or estrogen and prevent ovulation and thus the possibility of pregnancy by suppressing the secretion of the gonadotropins follicle-stimulating hormone (FSH) and luteinizing hormone (LH), the peak of which around the middle of the menstrual cycle causes ovulation to occur.

=== Hormonal cancer ===
==== Prostate cancer ====
Estradiol is used as a form of high-dose estrogen therapy to treat prostate cancer and is similarly effective to other therapies such as androgen deprivation therapy with castration and antiandrogens. It is used in the form of long-lasting injected estradiol prodrugs like polyestradiol phosphate, estradiol valerate, and estradiol undecylate, and has also more recently been assessed in the form of transdermal estradiol patches. Estrogens are effective in the treatment of prostate cancer by suppressing testosterone levels into the castrate range, increasing levels of sex hormone-binding globulin (SHBG) and thereby decreasing the fraction of free testosterone, and possibly also via direct cytotoxic effects on prostate cancer cells. Parenteral estradiol is largely free of the cardiovascular side effects of the high oral dosages of synthetic estrogens like diethylstilbestrol ad ethinylestradiol that were used previously. In addition, estrogens may have advantages relative to castration in terms of hot flashes, sexual interest and function, osteoporosis, cognitive function, and quality of life. However, side effects such as gynecomastia and feminization in general may be difficult to tolerate and unacceptable for many men.

==== Breast cancer ====
High-dose estrogen therapy is effective in the treatment of about 35% of cases of breast cancer in women who are at least 5 years menopausal and has comparable effectiveness to antiestrogen therapy with medications like the selective estrogen receptor modulator (SERM) tamoxifen. Although estrogens are rarely used in the treatment of breast cancer today and synthetic estrogens like diethylstilbestrol and ethinylestradiol have most commonly been used, estradiol itself has been used in the treatment of breast cancer as well. It has been used orally at very high doses (30 mg/day) in the treatment of therapy-naive breast cancer and orally at low doses (2 to 6 mg/day) in the treatment of breast cancer in women who were previously treated with and benefited from but acquired resistance to aromatase inhibitors. Polyestradiol phosphate is also used to treat breast cancer.

=== Other uses ===
==== Infertility ====
Estrogens may be used in treatment of infertility in women when there is a need to develop sperm-friendly cervical mucus or an appropriate uterine lining.

It is also commonly used during in vitro fertilization (IVF). Estrogen helps maintain the endometrial lining of the uterus and help prepare for pregnancy. Research shows higher pregnancy rate if the mother takes estrogen in addition to progesterone. Estradiol is the predominant form of estrogen during reproductive years and is most commonly prescribed.

==== Lactation suppression ====
Estrogens can be used to suppress and cease lactation and breast engorgement in postpartum women who do not wish to breastfeed. They do this by directly decreasing the sensitivity of the alveoli of the mammary glands to the lactogenic hormone prolactin.

==== Tall stature ====
Estrogens have been used to limit final height in adolescent girls with tall stature. They do this by inducing epiphyseal closure and suppressing growth hormone-induced hepatic production and by extension circulating levels of insulin-like growth factor-1 (IGF-1), a hormone that causes the body to grow and increase in size. Although ethinylestradiol and conjugated estrogens have mainly been used for this purpose, estradiol can also be employed.

==== Breast enhancement ====
Estrogens are involved in breast development and estradiol may be used as a form of hormonal breast enhancement to increase the size of the breasts. Both polyestradiol phosphate monotherapy and pseudopregnancy with a combination of high-dosage intramuscular estradiol valerate and hydroxyprogesterone caproate have been assessed for this purpose in clinical studies. However, acute or temporary breast enlargement is a well-known side effect of estrogens, and increases in breast size tend to regress following discontinuation of treatment. Aside from those without prior established breast development, evidence is lacking for a sustained increases in breast size with estrogens.

==== Schizophrenia ====
Estradiol has been found to be effective in the adjunctive treatment of schizophrenia in women. It has been found to significantly reduce positive, negative, and cognitive symptoms, with particular benefits on positive symptoms. Other estrogens, as well as selective estrogen receptor modulators (SERMs) like raloxifene, have been found to be effective in the adjunctive treatment of schizophrenia in women similarly. Estrogens may be useful in the treatment of schizophrenia in men as well, but their use in this population is limited by feminizing side effects. SERMs, which have few or no feminizing side effects, have been found to be effective in the adjunctive treatment of schizophrenia in men similarly to in women and may be more useful than estrogens in this sex.

==== Sexual deviance ====
Estradiol has been used at high doses to suppress sex drive in men with sexual deviance such as paraphilias and in sex offenders. It has specifically been used for this indication in the forms of intramuscular injections of estradiol valerate and estradiol undecylate and of subcutaneous pellet implants of estradiol.

=== Available forms ===
Available forms of estradiol (Note: This table includes primarily products available as a single-ingredient estradiol preparation—thus excluding compounds with progestogens or other ingredients included. The table furthermore does not include compounded drugs—only commercially produced products. Availability of each product varies by country.)
| Route | Ingredient | Form | Dose (Note: Doses are given per unit (ex: per tablet, per mL).) | Brand names (Note: Other brand names may be manufactured or previously manufactured.) |
|---|---|---|---|---|
| Oral | Estradiol | Tablet | 0.1, 0.2, 0.5, 1, 2, 4 mg | Estrace, Ovocyclin |
| Oral | Estradiol valerate | Tablet | 0.5, 1, 2, 4 mg | Progynova |
| Transdermal | Estradiol | Patch | 14, 25, 37.5, 50, 60, 75, 100 µg/d | Climara, Vivelle |
| Transdermal | Estradiol | Gel pump | 0.06% (0.52, 0.75 mg/pump) | Elestrin, EstroGel |
| Transdermal | Estradiol | Gel packet | 0.1% (0.25, 0.5, 1.0 mg/pk.) | DiviGel, Sandrena |
| Transdermal | Estradiol | Emulsion | 0.25% (25 µg/pouch) | Estrasorb |
| Transdermal | Estradiol | Spray | 1.53 mg/spray | Evamist, Lenzetto |
| Vaginal | Estradiol | Tablet | 10, 25 µg | Vagifem |
| Vaginal | Estradiol | Cream | 0.01% (0.1 mg/gram) | Estrace |
| Vaginal | Estradiol | Insert | 4, 10 µg | Imvexxy |
| Vaginal | Estradiol | Ring | 2 mg/ring (7.5 µg/d, 3 mon.) | Estring |
| Vaginal | Estradiol acetate | Ring | 50, 100 µg/d, 3 months | Femring |
| Injection (Note: By intramuscular or subcutaneous injection.) | Estradiol | Microspheres | 1 mg/mL | Juvenum E |
| Injection | Estradiol benzoate | Oil solution | 0.167, 0.2, 0.333, 1, 1.67, 2, 5, 10, 20, 25 mg/mL | Progynon-B |
| Injection | Estradiol cypionate | Oil solution | 1, 3, 5 mg/mL | Depo-Estradiol |
| Injection | Estradiol valerate | Oil solution | 5, 10, 20, 40 mg/mL | Progynon Depot |
| Implant | Estradiol | Pellet | 20, 25, 50, 100 mg, 6 mon. | Estradiol Implants |
Notes and sources: Sources:

Estradiol is available in a variety of different formulations, including oral, intranasal, transdermal/topical, vaginal, injectable, and implantable preparations. An ester may be attached to one or both of the hydroxyl groups of estradiol to improve its oral bioavailability and/or duration of action with injection. Such modifications give rise to forms such as estradiol acetate (oral and vaginal), estradiol valerate (oral and injectable), estradiol cypionate (injectable), estradiol benzoate (injectable), estradiol undecylate (injectable), and polyestradiol phosphate (injectable; a polymerized ester of estradiol), which are all prodrugs of estradiol.

Gallery of available forms of estradiol
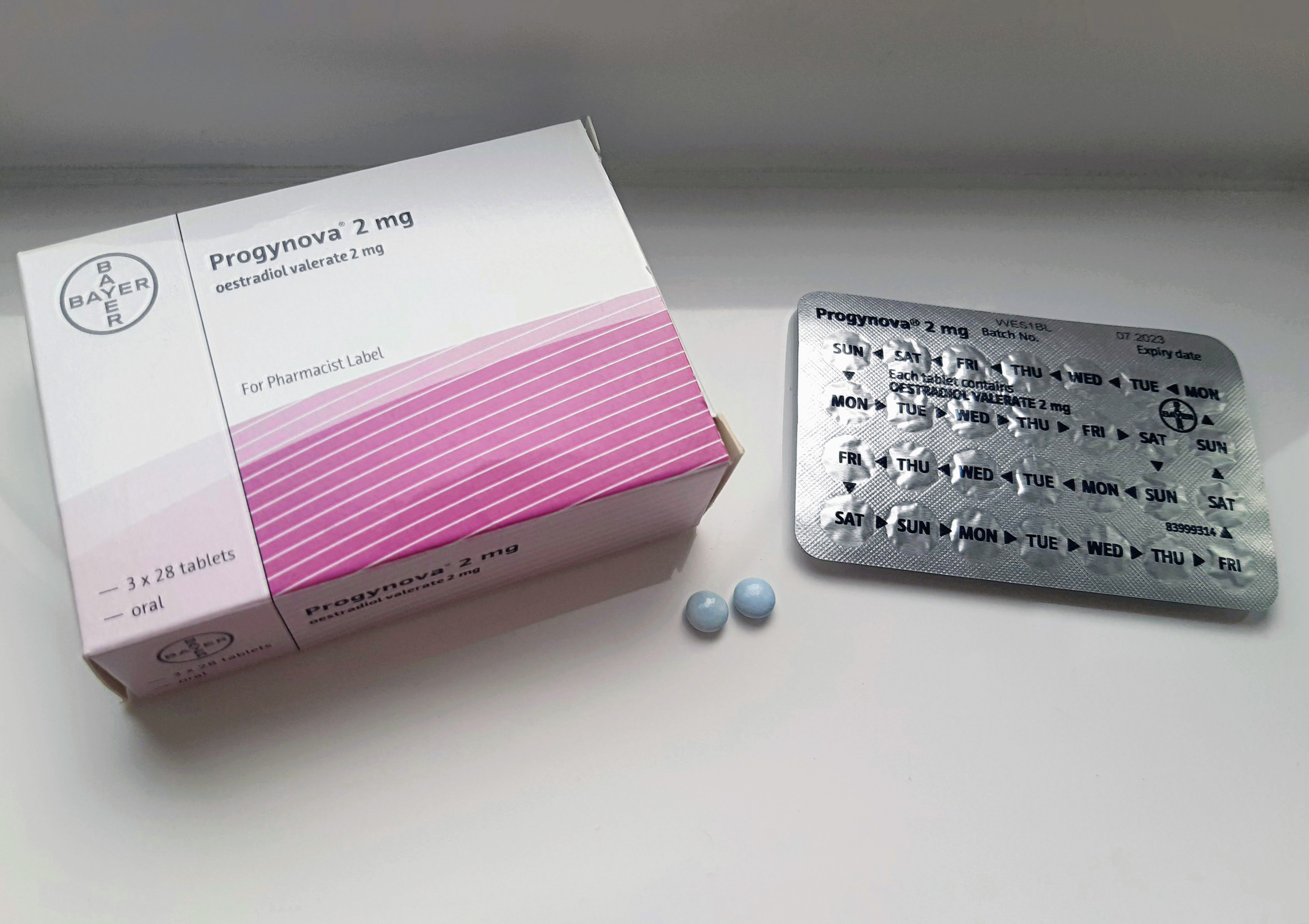
Progynova (estradiol valerate) 2 mg oral tablets.

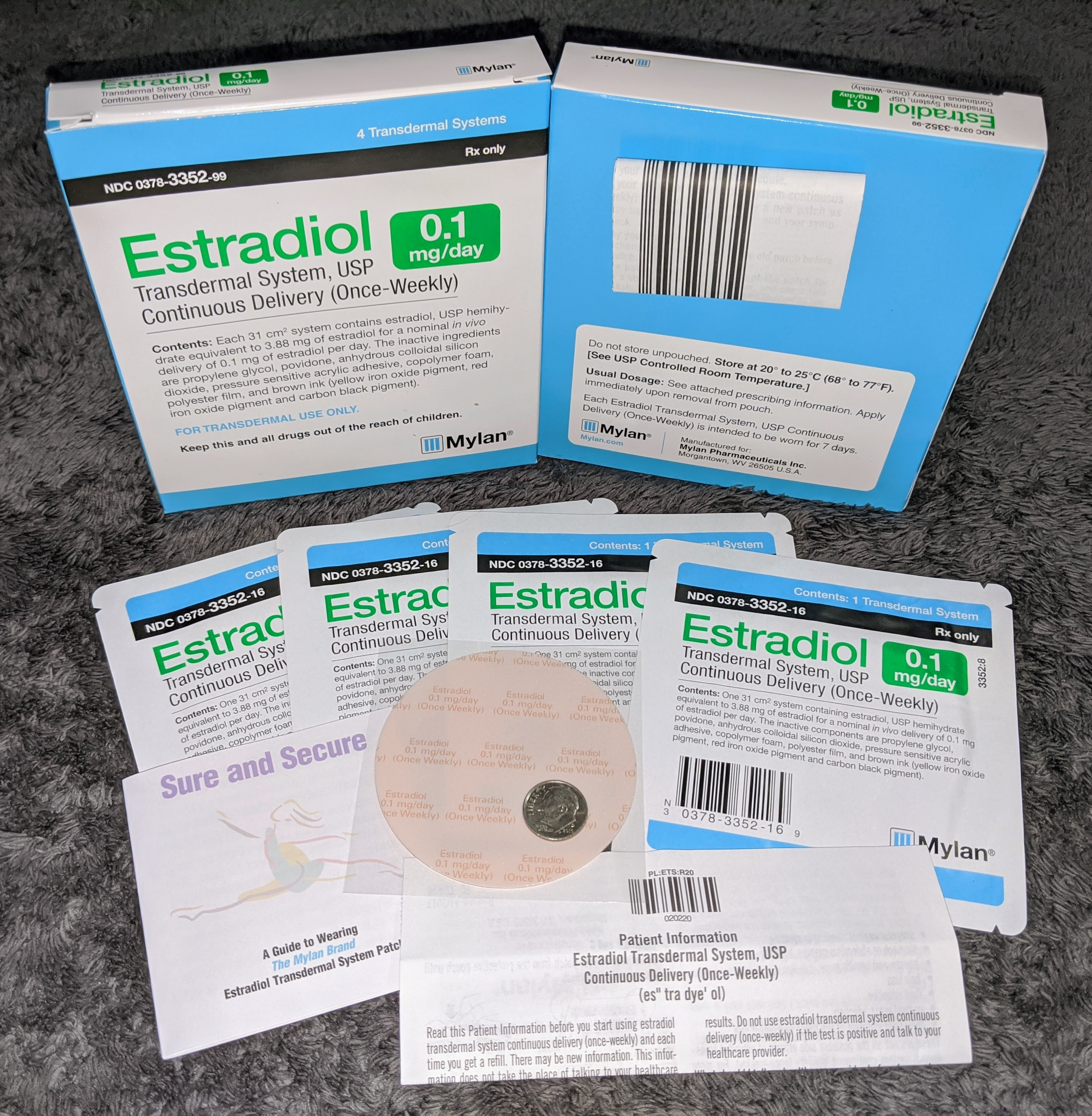
Generic estradiol (Mylan) 100 μg/day once-weekly transdermal patches.

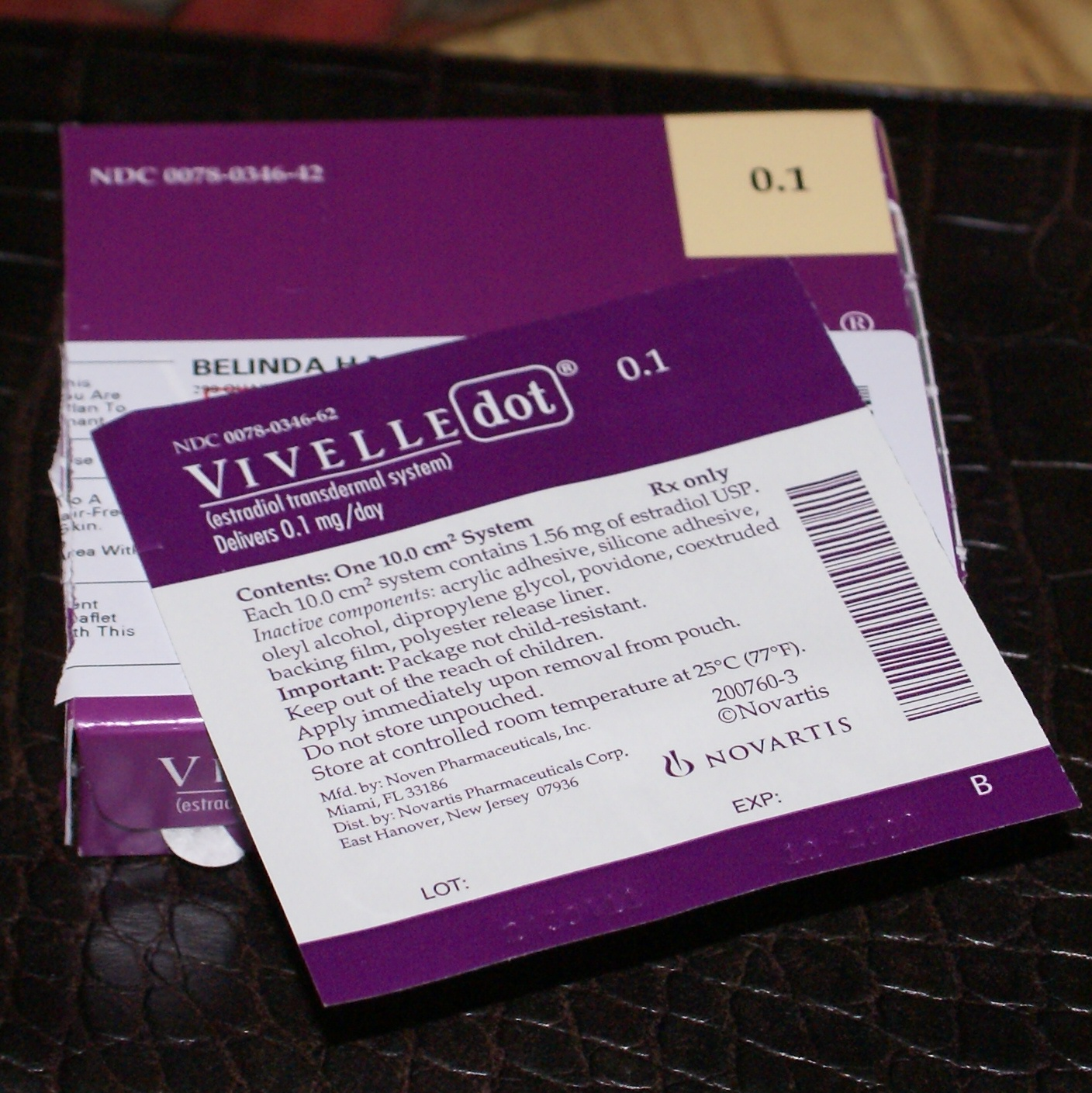
Vivelle-Dot (estradiol) 100 μg/day twice-weekly transdermal patches.

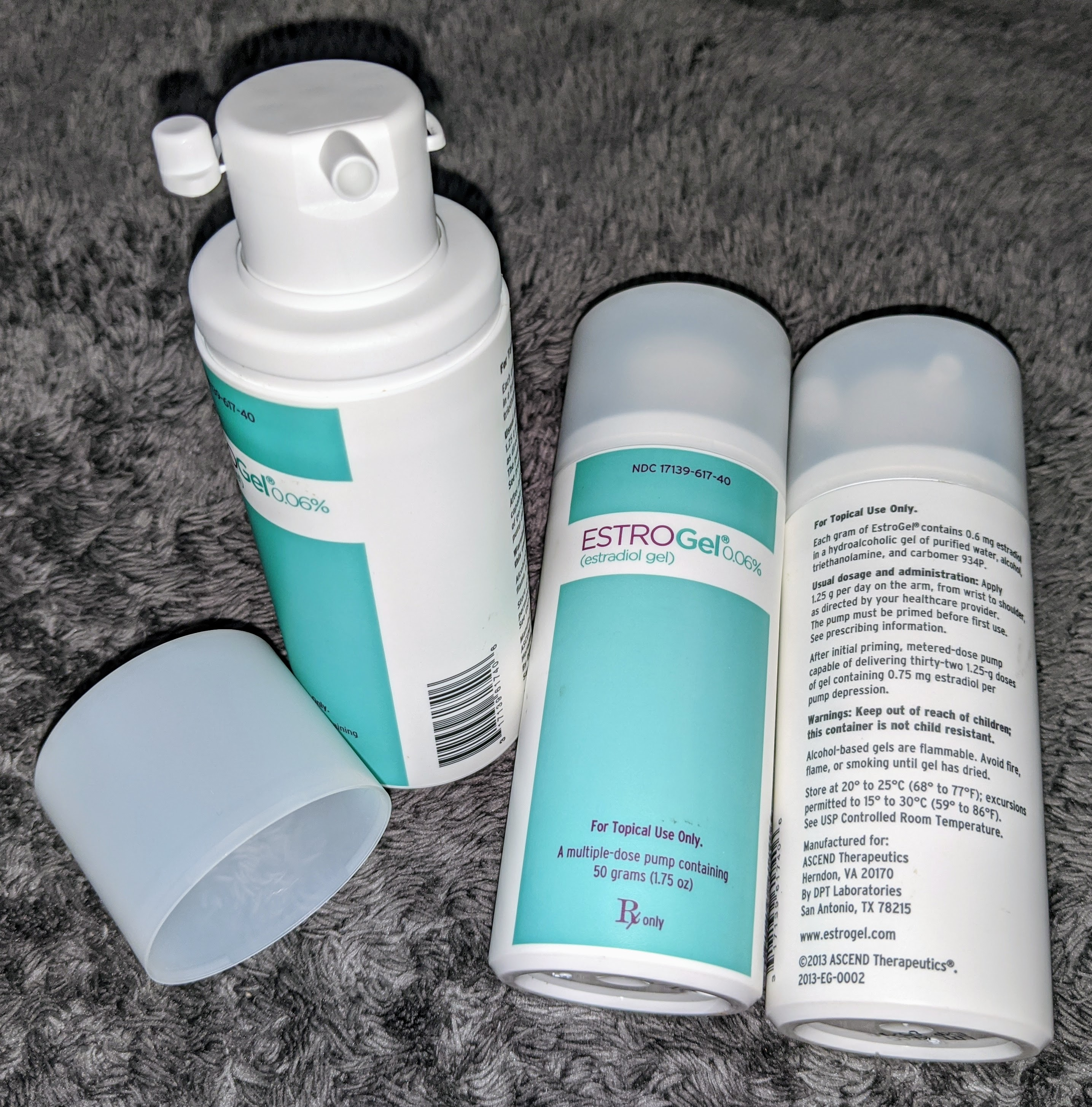
EstroGel 0.06% (estradiol) once-daily hydroalcoholic transdermal gel. Delivers 0.75 mg estradiol per pump.

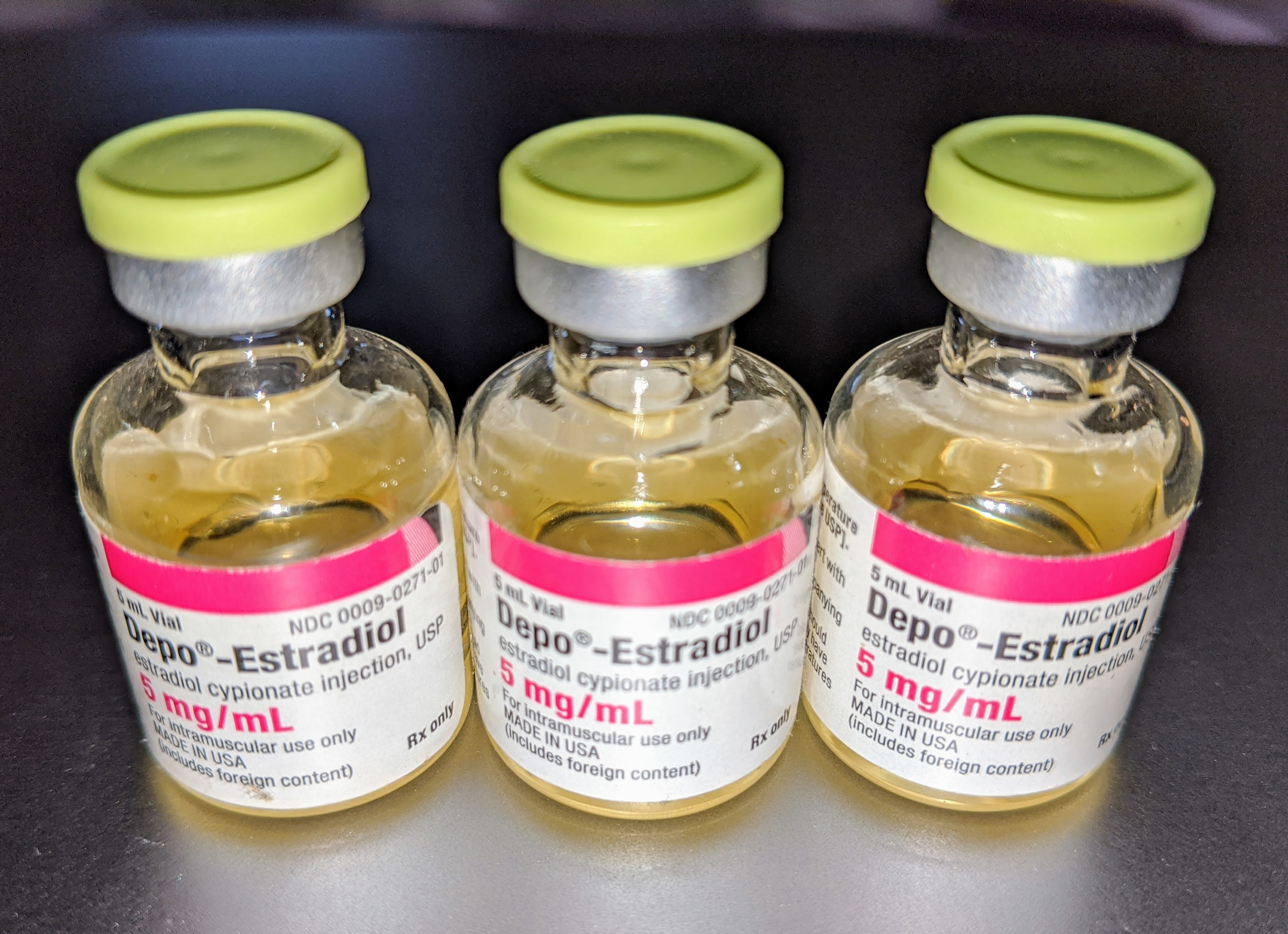
Depo-Estradiol 5 mg/mL (estradiol cypionate in oil solution) vials. Used by depot intramuscular injection.

== Contraindications ==
Estrogens like estradiol have a number of contraindications. Estradiol should be avoided when there is undiagnosed abnormal vaginal bleeding, known, suspected or a history of breast cancer, current treatment for metastatic disease, known or suspected estrogen-dependent neoplasia, deep vein thrombosis, pulmonary embolism or history of these conditions, active or recent arterial thromboembolic disease such as stroke, myocardial infarction, liver dysfunction or disease. Estradiol should not be taken by people with a hypersensitivity/allergy or those who are pregnant or are suspected pregnant.

== Side effects ==
Common side effects of estradiol in women include headache, breast pain or tenderness, breast enlargement, irregular vaginal bleeding or spotting, abdominal cramps, bloating, fluid retention, and nausea. Other possible side effects of estrogens may include high blood pressure, high blood sugar, enlargement of uterine fibroids, melasma, vaginal yeast infections, and liver problems. In men, estrogens can cause breast pain or tenderness, gynecomastia (male breast development), feminization, demasculinization, sexual dysfunction (decreased libido and erectile dysfunction), hypogonadism, testicular atrophy, and infertility.

Side effects of lower versus higher dose oral estradiol
| Serious adverse event | Estradiol 6 mg/day (n = 34) | | Estradiol 30 mg/day (n = 32) | |
| Serious adverse event | n | % | n | % |
|---|---|---|---|---|
| Nausea/vomiting | 0 | 0.0 | 5 | 15.6 |
| Hyponatremia | 1 | 2.9 | 5 | 15.6 |
| Pleural effusion | 0 | 0.0 | 4 | 12.5 |
| Pain | 6 | 17.6 | 4 | 12.5 |
| Thrombosis/embolism | 1 | 2.9 | 1 | 3.1 |
| Brain ischemia | 1 | 2.9 | 0 | 0.0 |
| Infection | 2 | 5.9 | 3 | 9.4 |
| Hypercalcemia | 0 | 0.0 | 2 | 6.3 |
| Other | 6 | 17.6 | 10 | 31.3 |
Summary: Side effects in a small phase 2 study of women with metastatic breast cancer randomized to receive either 6 or 30 mg/day of oral estradiol as therapy. "The adverse event rate (≥grade 3) in the 30-mg group (11/32 [34%]; 95% confidence interval [CI], 23%-47%) was higher than in the 6-mg group (4/34 [18%]; 95% CI, 5%-22%; p=0.03). Clinical benefit rates were 9 of 32 (28%; 95% CI, 18%-41%) in the 30-mg group and 10 of 34 (29%; 95% CI, 19%-42%) in the 6-mg group." Sources: See template.

=== Blood clots ===
Oral estradiol and estradiol valerate, for instance in menopausal hormone therapy or birth control pills, are associated with a significantly higher risk of venous thromboembolism (VTE) than non-use. Higher doses of oral estrogens are associated with higher risks of VTE. In contrast to oral estradiol, transdermal and vaginal estradiol at menopausal replacement dosages are not associated with a higher incidence of VTE. Low doses (e.g., 50 μg/day) and high doses (e.g., 100 μg/day) of transdermal estradiol for menopausal replacement do not differ in terms of VTE risk. The higher risk of VTE with oral estradiol can be attributed to the first pass and a disproportionate effect on liver synthesis of coagulation factors. Even high doses of parenteral estradiol, such as high-dose polyestradiol phosphate, have minimal influence on coagulation factors, in contrast to oral estrogen therapy. However, sufficient doses of parenteral estradiol, for instance very high doses of estradiol valerate by intramuscular injection, can nonetheless activate coagulation, presumably increasing VTE risk.

In addition to the route of administration, the type of estrogen influences VTE risk. Oral conjugated estrogens are associated with a higher risk of VTE than oral estradiol. Estradiol- and estradiol valerate-containing birth control pills are associated with a lower risk of VTE than birth control pills containing ethinylestradiol. The relative risk of VTE is thought to be highest with oral ethinylestradiol, intermediate with oral conjugated estrogens, low with oral estradiol and parenteral estradiol valerate, and very low with transdermal estradiol. Conjugated estrogens and ethinylestradiol are thought to have a higher risk of VTE than estradiol because they are resistant to hepatic metabolism and have a disproportionate influence on liver production of coagulation factors.

The combination of oral or transdermal estradiol and a progestin is associated with a higher risk of VTE than estradiol alone. Dydrogesterone is associated with a lower risk than other progestins such as medroxyprogesterone acetate and norethisterone, while oral progesterone is associated with no increase in risk of VTE. Older age, higher body weight, lower physical activity, and smoking are all associated with a higher risk of VTE with oral estrogen therapy. Risk of VTE with estrogen therapy is highest at the start of treatment, particularly during the first year, and decreases over time.

The absolute risk of VTE with estrogen and/or progestin therapy is small. Women who are not on a birth control pill or hormone therapy have a risk of VTE of about 1 to 5 out of 10,000 women per year. In women taking a birth control pill containing ethinylestradiol and a progestin, the risk of VTE is in the range of 3 to 10 out of 10,000 women per year. Birth control pills containing estradiol valerate and a progestin are associated with about half the risk of VTE of ethinylestradiol/progestin-containing birth control pills. Hormone therapy for transgender women likewise is associated with a lower risk of VTE than birth control pills containing ethinylestradiol and a progestin. The risk of VTE during pregnancy, when estrogens and progesterone increase to very high levels, is 5 to 20 in 10,000 women per year, while the risk is 40 to 65 per 10,000 women per year during the postpartum period.

Risk of venous thromboembolism (VTE) with hormone therapy and birth control (QResearch/CPRD)
| Type | Route | Medications | Odds ratio (95% CI) |
|---|---|---|---|
| Menopausal hormone therapy | Oral | Estradiol alone ≤1 mg/day >1 mg/day | 1.27 (1.16–1.39)*; 1.22 (1.09–1.37)*; 1.35 (1.18–1.55)* |
| Menopausal hormone therapy | Oral | Conjugated estrogens alone ≤0.625 mg/day >0.625 mg/day | 1.49 (1.39–1.60)*; 1.40 (1.28–1.53)*; 1.71 (1.51–1.93)* |
| Menopausal hormone therapy | Oral | Estradiol/medroxyprogesterone acetate | 1.44 (1.09–1.89)* |
| Menopausal hormone therapy | Oral | Estradiol/dydrogesterone ≤1 mg/day E2 >1 mg/day E2 | 1.18 (0.98–1.42); 1.12 (0.90–1.40); 1.34 (0.94–1.90) |
| Menopausal hormone therapy | Oral | Estradiol/norethisterone ≤1 mg/day E2 >1 mg/day E2 | 1.68 (1.57–1.80)*; 1.38 (1.23–1.56)*; 1.84 (1.69–2.00)* |
| Menopausal hormone therapy | Oral | Estradiol/norgestrel or estradiol/drospirenone | 1.42 (1.00–2.03) |
| Menopausal hormone therapy | Oral | Conjugated estrogens/medroxyprogesterone acetate | 2.10 (1.92–2.31)* |
| Menopausal hormone therapy | Oral | Conjugated estrogens/norgestrel ≤0.625 mg/day CEEs >0.625 mg/day CEEs | 1.73 (1.57–1.91)*; 1.53 (1.36–1.72)*; 2.38 (1.99–2.85)* |
| Menopausal hormone therapy | Oral | Tibolone alone | 1.02 (0.90–1.15) |
| Menopausal hormone therapy | Oral | Raloxifene alone | 1.49 (1.24–1.79)* |
| Menopausal hormone therapy | Transdermal | Estradiol alone ≤50 μg/day >50 μg/day | 0.96 (0.88–1.04); 0.94 (0.85–1.03); 1.05 (0.88–1.24) |
| Menopausal hormone therapy | Transdermal | Estradiol/progestogen | 0.88 (0.73–1.01) |
| Menopausal hormone therapy | Vaginal | Estradiol alone | 0.84 (0.73–0.97) |
| Menopausal hormone therapy | Vaginal | Conjugated estrogens alone | 1.04 (0.76–1.43) |
| Combined birth control | Oral | Ethinylestradiol/norethisterone | 2.56 (2.15–3.06)* |
| Combined birth control | Oral | Ethinylestradiol/levonorgestrel | 2.38 (2.18–2.59)* |
| Combined birth control | Oral | Ethinylestradiol/norgestimate | 2.53 (2.17–2.96)* |
| Combined birth control | Oral | Ethinylestradiol/desogestrel | 4.28 (3.66–5.01)* |
| Combined birth control | Oral | Ethinylestradiol/gestodene | 3.64 (3.00–4.43)* |
| Combined birth control | Oral | Ethinylestradiol/drospirenone | 4.12 (3.43–4.96)* |
| Combined birth control | Oral | Ethinylestradiol/cyproterone acetate | 4.27 (3.57–5.11)* |
Notes: (1) Nested case–control studies (2015, 2019) based on data from the QResearch and Clinical Practice Research Datalink (CPRD) databases. (2) Bioidentical progesterone was not included, but is known to be associated with no additional risk relative to estrogen alone. Footnotes: * = Statistically significant (p < 0.01). Sources: See template.

=== Long-term effects ===
Uncommon but serious possible side effects of estrogens associated with long-term therapy may include breast cancer, uterine cancer, stroke, heart attack, blood clots, dementia, gallbladder disease, and ovarian cancer. Warning signs of these serious side effects include breast lumps, unusual vaginal bleeding, dizziness, faintness, changes in speech, severe headaches, chest pain, shortness of breath, pain in the legs, changes in vision, and vomiting.

Due to health risks observed with the combination of conjugated estrogens and medroxyprogesterone acetate in the Women's Health Initiative (WHI) studies (see below), the US Food and Drug Administration (FDA) label for Estrace (estradiol) advises that estrogens should be used in menopausal hormone therapy only for the shortest time possible and at the lowest effective dose. While the FDA states that is unknown if these risks generalize to estradiol (alone or in combination with progesterone or a progestin), it advises that in the absence of comparable data, the risks should be assumed to be similar. When used to treat menopausal symptoms, the FDA recommends that discontinuation of estradiol should be attempted every three to six months via a gradual dose taper.

The combination of bioidentical transdermal or vaginal estradiol and oral or vaginal progesterone appears to be a safer form of hormone therapy than the combination of oral conjugated estrogens and medroxyprogesterone acetate and may not share the same health risks. Advantages may include reduced or no risk of venous thromboembolism, cardiovascular disease, and breast cancer, among others.

Results of the Women's Health Initiative (WHI) menopausal hormone therapy randomized controlled trials
| Clinical outcome | Hypothesized effect on risk | Estrogen and progestogen (CEs 0.625 mg/day p.o. + MPA 2.5 mg/day p.o.) (n = 16,608, with uterus, 5.2–5.6 years follow up) | | | Estrogen alone (CEs 0.625 mg/day p.o.) (n = 10,739, no uterus, 6.8–7.1 years follow up) | | |
| Clinical outcome | Hypothesized effect on risk | HR | 95% CI | AR | HR | 95% CI | AR |
|---|---|---|---|---|---|---|---|
| Coronary heart disease | Decreased | 1.24 | 1.00–1.54 | +6 / 10,000 PYs | 0.95 | 0.79–1.15 | −3 / 10,000 PYs |
| Stroke | Decreased | 1.31 | 1.02–1.68 | +8 / 10,000 PYs | 1.37 | 1.09–1.73 | +12 / 10,000 PYs |
| Pulmonary embolism | Increased | 2.13 | 1.45–3.11 | +10 / 10,000 PYs | 1.37 | 0.90–2.07 | +4 / 10,000 PYs |
| Venous thromboembolism | Increased | 2.06 | 1.57–2.70 | +18 / 10,000 PYs | 1.32 | 0.99–1.75 | +8 / 10,000 PYs |
| Breast cancer | Increased | 1.24 | 1.02–1.50 | +8 / 10,000 PYs | 0.80 | 0.62–1.04 | −6 / 10,000 PYs |
| Colorectal cancer | Decreased | 0.56 | 0.38–0.81 | −7 / 10,000 PYs | 1.08 | 0.75–1.55 | +1 / 10,000 PYs |
| Endometrial cancer | – | 0.81 | 0.48–1.36 | −1 / 10,000 PYs | – | – | – |
| Hip fractures | Decreased | 0.67 | 0.47–0.96 | −5 / 10,000 PYs | 0.65 | 0.45–0.94 | −7 / 10,000 PYs |
| Total fractures | Decreased | 0.76 | 0.69–0.83 | −47 / 10,000 PYs | 0.71 | 0.64–0.80 | −53 / 10,000 PYs |
| Total mortality | Decreased | 0.98 | 0.82–1.18 | −1 / 10,000 PYs | 1.04 | 0.91–1.12 | +3 / 10,000 PYs |
| Global index | – | 1.15 | 1.03–1.28 | +19 / 10,000 PYs | 1.01 | 1.09–1.12 | +2 / 10,000 PYs |
| Diabetes | – | 0.79 | 0.67–0.93 | | 0.88 | 0.77–1.01 | |
| Gallbladder disease | Increased | 1.59 | 1.28–1.97 | | 1.67 | 1.35–2.06 | |
| Stress incontinence | – | 1.87 | 1.61–2.18 | | 2.15 | 1.77–2.82 | |
| Urge incontinence | – | 1.15 | 0.99–1.34 | | 1.32 | 1.10–1.58 | |
| Peripheral artery disease | – | 0.89 | 0.63–1.25 | | 1.32 | 0.99–1.77 | |
| Probable dementia | Decreased | 2.05 | 1.21–3.48 | | 1.49 | 0.83–2.66 | |
Abbreviations: CEs = conjugated estrogens. MPA = medroxyprogesterone acetate. p.o. = per oral. HR = hazard ratio. AR = attributable risk. PYs = person–years. CI = confidence interval. Notes: Sample sizes (n) include placebo recipients, which were about half of patients. "Global index" is defined for each woman as the time to earliest diagnosis for coronary heart disease, stroke, pulmonary embolism, breast cancer, colorectal cancer, endometrial cancer (estrogen plus progestogen group only), hip fractures, and death from other causes. Sources: See template.

== Overdose ==
Estrogens are relatively safe in overdose. During pregnancy, levels of estradiol increase to very high concentrations that are as much as 100-fold normal levels. In late pregnancy, the body produces and secretes approximately 100 mg of estrogens, including estradiol, estrone, and estriol, per day. Doses of estradiol of as high as 200 mg per day by intramuscular injection for several weeks have been administered to humans in studies. Serious adverse effects have not been described following acute overdose of large doses of estrogen- and progestogen-containing birth control pills by small children. Symptoms of estrogen overdosage may include nausea, vomiting, bloating, increased weight, water retention, breast tenderness, vaginal discharge, vaginal bleeding, heavy legs, and leg cramps.

== Interactions ==
Inducers of cytochrome P450 enzymes like CYP3A4 such as St. John's wort, phenobarbital, carbamazepine and rifampicin decrease the circulating levels of estradiol by accelerating its metabolism, whereas inhibitors of cytochrome P450 enzymes like CYP3A4 such as erythromycin, cimetidine, clarithromycin, ketoconazole, itraconazole, ritonavir and grapefruit juice may slow its metabolism resulting in increased levels of estradiol in the circulation. There is an interaction between estradiol and alcohol such that alcohol considerably increases circulating levels of estradiol during oral estradiol therapy and also increases estradiol levels in normal premenopausal women and with parenteral estradiol therapy. This appears to be due to a decrease in hepatic 17β-hydroxysteroid dehydrogenase type 2 (17β-HSD2) activity and hence estradiol inactivation into estrone due to an alcohol-mediated increase in the ratio of NADH to NAD in the liver. Spironolactone may reduce the bioavailability of high doses of oral estradiol.

== Pharmacology ==
=== Pharmacodynamics ===
Estradiol is an estrogen, or an agonist of the estrogen receptors (ERs), the ERα and ERβ. It is also an agonist of membrane estrogen receptors (mERs), including the GPER, G_{q}-mER, ER-X, and ERx. Estradiol is highly selective for these ERs and mERs, and does not interact importantly with other steroid hormone receptors. It is far more potent as an estrogen than are other bioidentical estrogens like estrone and estriol. Given by subcutaneous injection in mice, estradiol is about 10-fold more potent than estrone and about 100-fold more potent than estriol.

The ERs are expressed widely throughout the body, including in the breasts, uterus, vagina, fat, skin, bone, liver, pituitary gland, hypothalamus, and other parts of the brain. In accordance, estradiol has numerous effects throughout the body. Among other effects, estradiol produces breast development, feminization, changes in the female reproductive system, changes in liver protein synthesis, and changes in brain function. The effects of estradiol can influence health in both positive and negative ways. In addition to the aforementioned effects, estradiol has antigonadotropic effects due to its estrogenic activity, and can inhibit ovulation and suppress gonadal sex hormone production. At sufficiently high dosages, estradiol is a powerful antigonadotropin, capable of suppressing testosterone levels into the castrate/female range in men.

There are differences between estradiol and other estrogens, such as non-bioidentical estrogens like natural conjugated estrogens and synthetic estrogens like ethinylestradiol and diethylstilbestrol, with implications for pharmacodynamics and pharmacokinetics as well as efficacy, tolerability, and safety.

=== Pharmacokinetics ===
Estradiol can be taken by a variety of different routes of administration. These include oral, buccal, sublingual, intranasal, transdermal (gels, creams, patches), vaginal (tablets, creams, rings, suppositories), rectal, by intramuscular or subcutaneous injection (in oil or aqueous), and as a subcutaneous implant. The pharmacokinetics of estradiol, including its bioavailability, metabolism, biological half-life, and other parameters, differ by route of administration. Likewise, the potency of estradiol, and its local effects in certain tissues, most importantly the liver, differ by route of administration as well. In particular, the oral route is subject to a high first-pass effect, which results in high levels of estradiol and consequent estrogenic effects in the liver and low potency due to first-pass hepatic and intestinal metabolism into metabolites like estrone and estrogen conjugates. Conversely, this is not the case for parenteral (non-oral) routes, which bypass the intestines and liver.

Different estradiol routes and dosages can achieve widely varying circulating estradiol levels. For purposes of comparison with normal physiological circumstances, menstrual cycle circulating levels of estradiol in premenopausal women are 40 pg/mL in the early follicular phase, 250 pg/mL at the middle of the cycle, and 100 pg/mL during the mid-luteal phase. Mean integrated levels of circulating estradiol in premenopausal women across the whole menstrual cycle have been reported to be in the range of 80 and 150 pg/mL, according to some sources.

== Chemistry ==
Structures of major endogenous estrogens
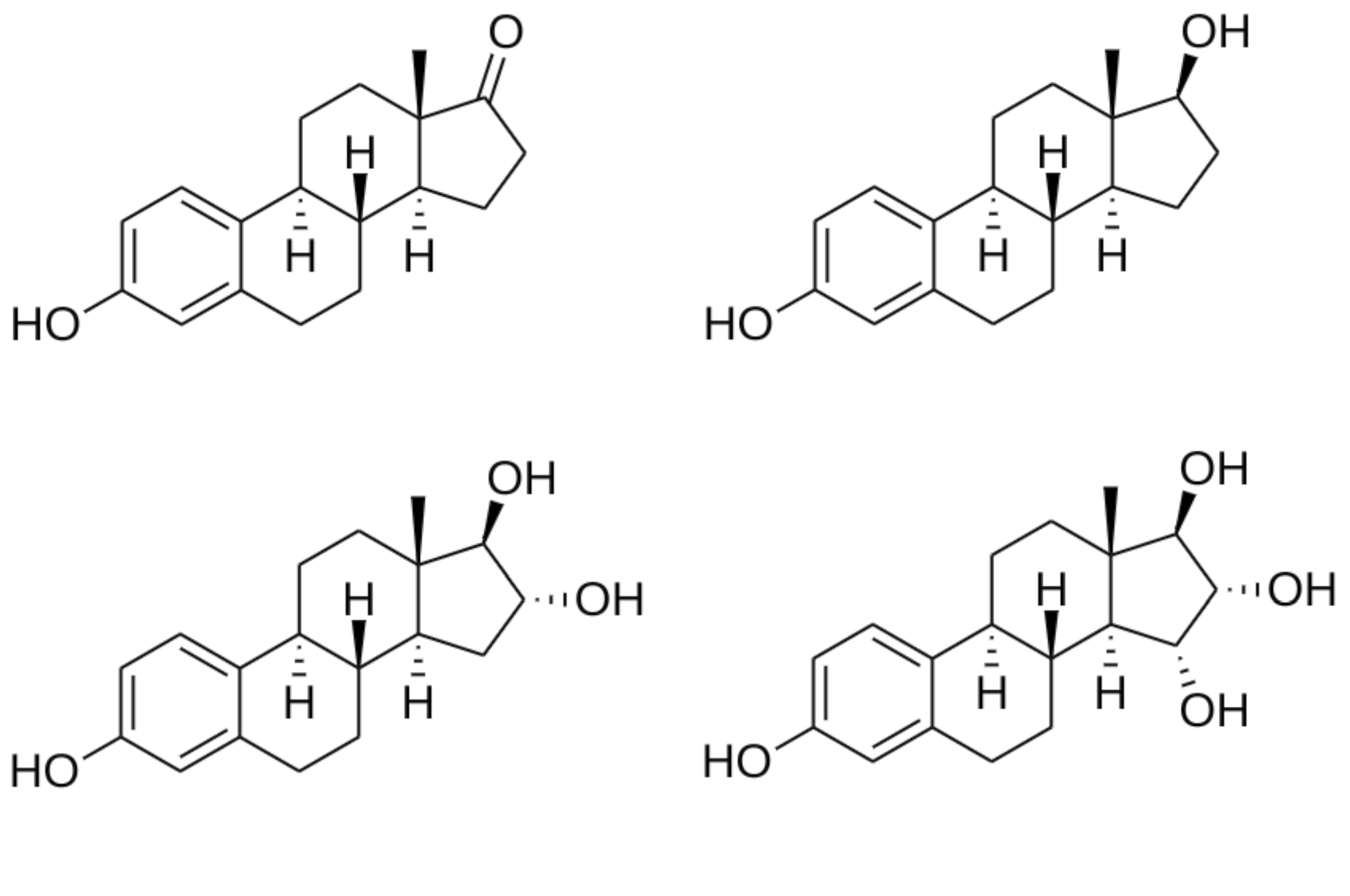
Note the hydroxyl (–OH) groups: estrone (E1) has one, estradiol (E2) has two, estriol (E3) has three, and estetrol (E4) has four.

Estradiol is a naturally occurring estrane steroid. It is also known as 17β-estradiol (to distinguish it from 17α-estradiol) or as estra-1,3,5(10)-triene-3,17β-diol. It has two hydroxyl groups, one at the C3 position and the other at the C17β position, as well as three double bonds in the A ring (the estra-1,3,5(10)-triene core). Due to its two hydroxyl groups, estradiol is often abbreviated as E2. The structurally related estrogens, estrone (E1), estriol (E3), and estetrol (E4) have one, three, and four hydroxyl groups, respectively.

=== Hemihydrate ===
A hemihydrate form of estradiol, estradiol hemihydrate, is widely used medically under a large number of brand names similarly to estradiol. In terms of activity and bioequivalence, estradiol and its hemihydrate are identical, with the only disparities being an approximate 3% difference in potency by weight (due to the presence of water molecules in the hemihydrate form of the substance) and a slower rate of release with certain formulations of the hemihydrate. This is because estradiol hemihydrate is more hydrated than anhydrous estradiol, and for this reason, is more insoluble in water in comparison, which results in slower absorption rates with specific formulations of the drug such as vaginal tablets. Estradiol hemihydrate has also been shown to result in less systemic absorption as a vaginal tablet formulation relative to other topical estradiol formulations such as vaginal creams. Estradiol hemihydrate is used in place of estradiol in some estradiol products.

=== Derivatives ===
A variety of C17β and/or C3 ester prodrugs of estradiol, such as estradiol acetate, estradiol benzoate, estradiol cypionate, estradiol dipropionate, estradiol enanthate, estradiol undecylate, estradiol valerate, and polyestradiol phosphate (an estradiol ester in polymeric form), among many others, have been developed and introduced for medical use as estrogens. Estramustine phosphate is also an estradiol ester, but with a nitrogen mustard moiety attached, and is used as a cytostatic antineoplastic agent in the treatment of prostate cancer. Cloxestradiol acetate and promestriene are ether prodrugs of estradiol that have been introduced for medical use as estrogens as well, although they are little known and rarely used.

Synthetic derivatives of estradiol used as estrogens include ethinylestradiol, ethinylestradiol sulfonate, mestranol, methylestradiol, moxestrol, and quinestrol, all of which are 17α-substituted estradiol derivatives. Synthetic derivatives of estradiol used in scientific research include 8β-VE2 and 16α-LE2.

Structural properties of selected estradiol esters
| Estrogen | Structure | Ester(s) | | | | Relative mol. weight | Relative E2 content^{b} | log P^{c} |
| Estrogen | Structure | Position(s) | Moiet(ies) | Type | Length^{a} | Relative mol. weight | Relative E2 content^{b} | log P^{c} |
|---|---|---|---|---|---|---|---|---|
| Estradiol | | – | – | – | – | 1.00 | 1.00 | 4.0 |
| Estradiol acetate | | C3 | Ethanoic acid | Straight-chain fatty acid | 2 | 1.15 | 0.87 | 4.2 |
| Estradiol benzoate | | C3 | Benzoic acid | Aromatic fatty acid | – (~4–5) | 1.38 | 0.72 | 4.7 |
| Estradiol dipropionate | | C3, C17β | Propanoic acid (×2) | Straight-chain fatty acid | 3 (×2) | 1.41 | 0.71 | 4.9 |
| Estradiol valerate | | C17β | Pentanoic acid | Straight-chain fatty acid | 5 | 1.31 | 0.76 | 5.6–6.3 |
| Estradiol benzoate butyrate | | C3, C17β | Benzoic acid, butyric acid | Mixed fatty acid | – (~6, 2) | 1.64 | 0.61 | 6.3 |
| Estradiol cypionate | | C17β | Cyclopentylpropanoic acid | Cyclic fatty acid | – (~6) | 1.46 | 0.69 | 6.9 |
| Estradiol enanthate | | C17β | Heptanoic acid | Straight-chain fatty acid | 7 | 1.41 | 0.71 | 6.7–7.3 |
| Estradiol dienanthate | | C3, C17β | Heptanoic acid (×2) | Straight-chain fatty acid | 7 (×2) | 1.82 | 0.55 | 8.1–10.4 |
| Estradiol undecylate | | C17β | Undecanoic acid | Straight-chain fatty acid | 11 | 1.62 | 0.62 | 9.2–9.8 |
| Estradiol stearate | | C17β | Octadecanoic acid | Straight-chain fatty acid | 18 | 1.98 | 0.51 | 12.2–12.4 |
| Estradiol distearate | | C3, C17β | Octadecanoic acid (×2) | Straight-chain fatty acid | 18 (×2) | 2.96 | 0.34 | 20.2 |
| Estradiol sulfate | | C3 | Sulfuric acid | Water-soluble conjugate | – | 1.29 | 0.77 | 0.3–3.8 |
| Estradiol glucuronide | | C17β | Glucuronic acid | Water-soluble conjugate | – | 1.65 | 0.61 | 2.1–2.7 |
| Estramustine phosphate^{d} | | C3, C17β | Normustine, phosphoric acid | Water-soluble conjugate | – | 1.91 | 0.52 | 2.9–5.0 |
| Polyestradiol phosphate^{e} | | C3–C17β | Phosphoric acid | Water-soluble conjugate | – | 1.23^{f} | 0.81^{f} | 2.9^{g} |
Footnotes: ^{a} = Length of ester in carbon atoms for straight-chain fatty acids or approximate length of ester in carbon atoms for aromatic or cyclic fatty acids. ^{b} = Relative estradiol content by weight (i.e., relative estrogenic exposure). ^{c} = Experimental or predicted octanol/water partition coefficient (i.e., lipophilicity/hydrophobicity). Retrieved from PubChem, ChemSpider, and DrugBank. ^{d} = Also known as estradiol normustine phosphate. ^{e} = Polymer of estradiol phosphate (~13 repeat units). ^{f} = Relative molecular weight or estradiol content per repeat unit. ^{g} = log P of repeat unit (i.e., estradiol phosphate). Sources: See individual articles.

== History ==
Estradiol was first discovered and synthesized in 1933 via reduction of estrone. Subsequently, estradiol was isolated for the first time in 1935. It was also originally known as dihydroxyestrin, dihydrofolliculin, or alpha-estradiol.

Estradiol was first introduced for medical use, in the form of estradiol benzoate, a short-acting ester prodrug of estradiol administered by intramuscular injection in oil solution, under the brand name Progynon B in 1933. Estradiol itself was also marketed in the 1930s and 1940s in the form of oral tablets and solutions, vaginal suppositories, and topical ointments under a variety of brand names including Dimenformon, Gynoestryl, Ovocyclin, Progynon, and Progynon DH. Marketed vaginal estradiol suppositories were also used rectally. Estradiol dipropionate, another short-acting ester of estradiol in oil solution for use by intramuscular injection, was marketed under the brand name Di-Ovocylin by 1939. In contrast to estrone, estradiol was never marketed in oil solution for intramuscular injection. This is attributable to its short duration of action and the availability of longer-acting estradiol esters like estradiol benzoate and estradiol dipropionate.

Delivery of estrogens by nasal spray was studied in 1929, and an estradiol nasal spray for local use was marketed by Schering under the brand name Progynon DH Nasal Spray by 1941. Sublingual administration of estradiol was first described in the early 1940s. Buccal estradiol tablets were marketed by Schering under the brand name Progynon Buccal Tablets by 1949. Estradiol tablets for use by the sublingual route were marketed under the brand name Estradiol Membrettes in 1950, as well as under the brand name Diogynets by 1952. Longer-acting esters of estradiol in oil solution like estradiol valerate (Delestrogen, Progynon Depot), estradiol cypionate (Depo-Estradiol), and estradiol undecylate (Delestrec, Progynon Depot 100), as well as the polymeric estradiol ester polyestradiol phosphate in aqueous solution (Estradurin), were developed and introduced for use by intramuscular injection in the 1950s.

Due to poor absorption and low potency relative to other estrogens, oral estradiol was not widely used as late as the early 1970s. Instead, synthetic and animal-derived estrogens like conjugated estrogens, ethinylestradiol, and diethylstilbestrol were typically used by the oral route. In 1966, oral estradiol valerate was introduced by Schering for medical use under the brand name Progynova. Esterification of estradiol, as in estradiol valerate, was believed to improve its metabolic stability with oral administration. Studies in the 1960s showed that micronization of steroids such as spironolactone and norethisterone acetate improved their absorption and oral potency by several-fold. In 1972, micronization of estradiol was studied in women and was likewise found to improve the absorption and potency of estradiol by the oral route. Subsequently, oral micronized estradiol was introduced for medical use in the United States under the brand name Estrace in 1975. However, oral micronized estradiol valerate had been introduced by Schering in 1968. Oral micronized estradiol and oral estradiol valerate have similar bioavailability and are both now widely used throughout the world.

After the introduction of oral micronized estradiol, vaginal and intranasal micronized estradiol were evaluated in 1977 and both subsequently introduced.

The first transdermal estradiol gel, a hydroalcoholic gel known as EstroGel, was initially described in 1980 and was introduced in Europe around 1981. Transdermal estradiol gel did not become available in the United States until 2004, when EstroGel was introduced in this country as well. A transdermal estradiol emulsion, Estrasorb, was marketed in the United States in 2003 as well. One of the earliest reports of transdermal estradiol patches was published in 1983. Estraderm, a reservoir patch and the first transdermal estradiol patch to be marketed, was introduced in Europe in 1985 and in the United States in 1986. The first transdermal matrix estradiol patches to be introduced were Climara and Vivelle between 1994 and 1996, and were followed by many others.

Ethinylestradiol, a synthetic derivative of estradiol, was synthesized from estradiol by Inhoffen and Hohlweg in 1938 and was introduced for oral use by Schering in the United States under the brand name Estinyl in 1943. Starting in the 1950s, ethinylestradiol became widely used in birth control pills. Estradiol-containing birth control pills were initially studied in the 1970s, with the first report published in 1977. Development of birth control pills containing estradiol was motivated by the thrombotic risks of ethinylestradiol that were uncovered in the 1960s and 1970s. More than 15 attempts were made at development of an estradiol-containing birth control pill starting in the 1970s, but were unsuccessful due to unacceptable menstrual bleeding patterns. Estradiol valerate/cyproterone acetate (Femilar) was introduced for use as a birth control pill in Finland in 1993, but was never marketed elsewhere. Subsequently, estradiol valerate/dienogest (Natazia, Qlaira) was marketed as a birth control pill in 2008 and estradiol/nomegestrol acetate (Naemis, Zoely) was introduced in 2012.

== Society and culture ==
=== Generic names ===
Estradiol is the generic name of estradiol in American English and its INN, USAN, USP, BAN, DCF, and JAN. Estradiolo is the name of estradiol in Italian and the DCIT and estradiolum is its name in Latin, whereas its name remains unchanged as estradiol in Spanish, Portuguese, French, and German. Oestradiol was the former BAN of estradiol and its name in British English, but the spelling was eventually changed to estradiol. When estradiol is provided in its hemihydrate form, its INN is estradiol hemihydrate.

=== Brand names ===
Estradiol is marketed under a large number of brand names throughout the world. Examples of major brand names in which estradiol has been marketed in include Climara, Climen, Dermestril, Divigel, Estrace, Natifa, Estraderm, Estraderm TTS, Estradot, Estreva, Estrimax, Estring, Estrofem, EstroGel, Evorel, Fem7 (or FemSeven), Imvexxy, Menorest, Oesclim, OestroGel, Sandrena, Systen, and Vagifem. Estradiol valerate is marketed mainly as Progynova and Progynon-Depot, while it is marketed as Delestrogen in the US. Estradiol cypionate is used mainly in the US and is marketed under the brand name Depo-Estradiol. Estradiol acetate is available as Femtrace, Femring, and Menoring.

Estradiol is also widely available in combination with progestogens. It is available in combination with norethisterone acetate under the major brand names Activelle, Cliane, Estalis, Eviana, Evorel Conti, Evorel Sequi, Kliogest, Novofem, Sequidot, and Trisequens; with drospirenone as Angeliq; with dydrogesterone as Femoston, Femoston Conti; and with nomegestrol acetate as Zoely. Estradiol valerate is available with cyproterone acetate as Climen; with dienogest as Climodien and Qlaira; with norgestrel as Cyclo-Progynova and Progyluton; with levonorgestrel as Klimonorm; with medroxyprogesterone acetate as Divina and Indivina; and with norethisterone enantate as Mesigyna and Mesygest. Estradiol cypionate is available with medroxyprogesterone acetate as Cyclo-Provera, Cyclofem, Feminena, Lunelle, and Novafem; estradiol enantate with algestone acetophenide as Deladroxate and Topasel; and estradiol benzoate is marketed with progesterone as Mestrolar and Nomestrol.

Estradiol valerate is also widely available in combination with prasterone enantate (DHEA enantate) under the brand name Gynodian Depot.

=== Slang names ===
Estradiol has a number of humorous nicknames among the transgender community. Among them are titty skittles, tit-tacs, breast mints, femme&m's, antiboyotics, anticistamines, trans-mission fluid, and the Notorious H.R.T. "E" is also used as slang or as an abbreviation for estradiol in trans contexts, both colloquially and in research.

=== Availability ===
Estradiol and/or its esters are widely available in countries throughout the world in a variety of formulations.

Shortages of estradiol began around 2022, caused partly by the COVID-19 pandemic disrupting supply and due to increasing demand. In Britain, for example, prescriptions for all hormone replacement therapy drugs more than doubled between 2018 and 2022. The shortage remains as of March 2024.

==== United States ====
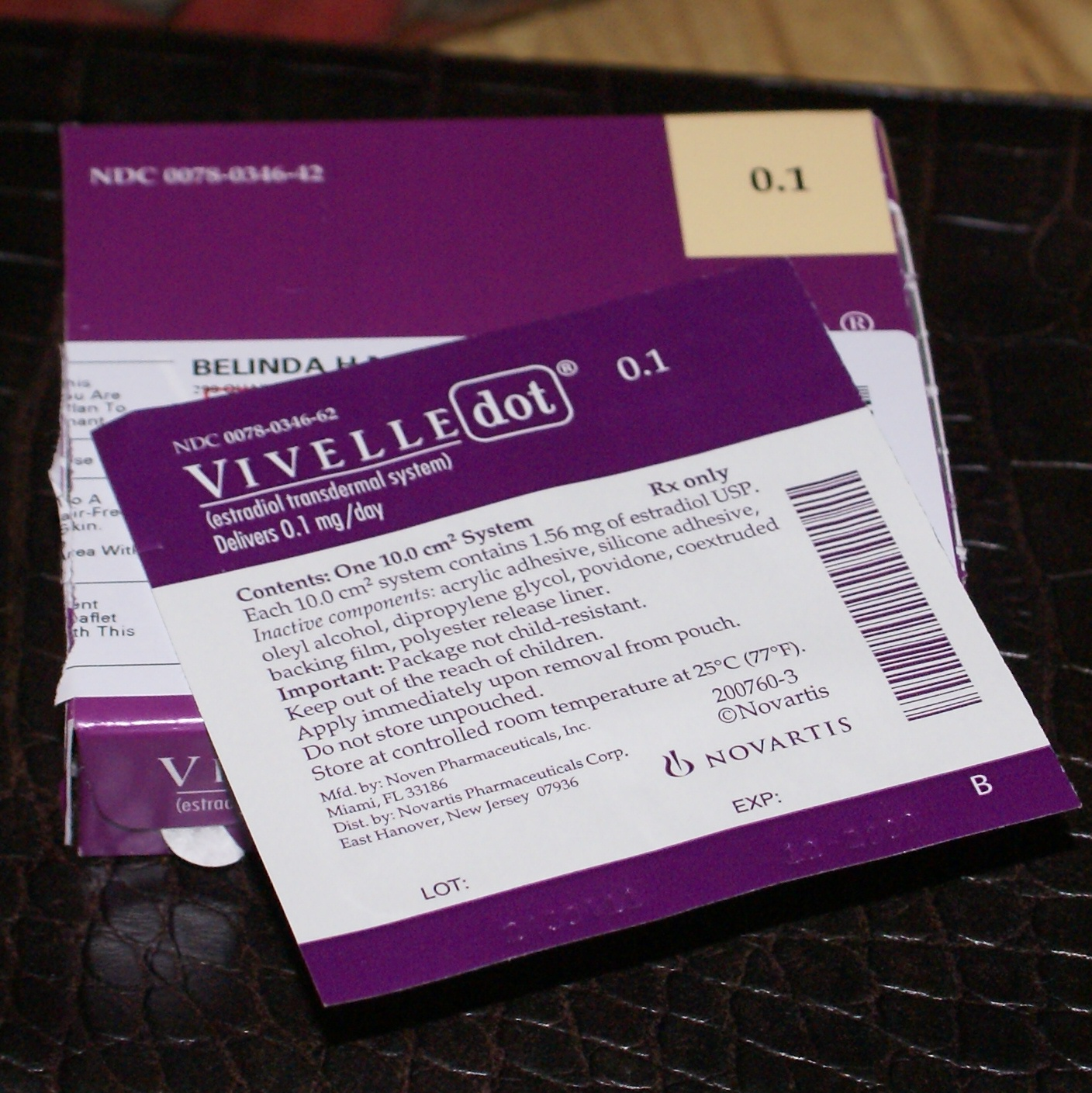
Vivelle-Dot, an estradiol patch

As of November 2016, estradiol is available in the United States in the following forms:

- Oral tablets (Femtrace (as estradiol acetate), Gynodiol, Innofem, generics)
- Transdermal patches (Alora, Climara, Esclim, Estraderm, FemPatch, Menostar, Minivelle, Vivelle, Vivelle-Dot, generics)
- Topical gels (Divigel, Elestrin, EstroGel, Sandrena), emulsions (Estrasorb), and sprays (Evamist)
- Vaginal tablets (Vagifem, generics), creams (Estrace), inserts (Imvexxy), and rings (Estring, Femring (as estradiol acetate))
- Oil solution for intramuscular injection (Delestrogen (as estradiol valerate), Depo-Estradiol (as estradiol cypionate))

Oral estradiol valerate (Progynova) and other esters of estradiol that are used by injection like estradiol benzoate, estradiol enantate, and estradiol undecylate all are not marketed in the US. Polyestradiol phosphate (Estradurin) was marketed in the US previously but is no longer available.

Estradiol is also available in the US in combination with progestogens for the treatment of menopausal symptoms and as a combined hormonal contraceptive:

- Oral oil-filled capsules with progesterone (Bijuva)
- Oral tablets with drospirenone (Angeliq) and norethisterone acetate (Activella, Amabelz) and as estradiol valerate with dienogest (Natazia)
- Transdermal patches with levonorgestrel (Climara Pro) and norethisterone acetate (Combipatch)

Estradiol and estradiol esters are also available in custom preparations from compounding pharmacies in the US. This includes subcutaneous pellet implants, which are not available in the United States as FDA-approved pharmaceutical drugs. In addition, topical creams that contain estradiol are generally regulated as cosmetics rather than as drugs in the US and hence are also sold over-the-counter and may be purchased without a prescription on the Internet.

==== Other countries ====
Pharmaceutical estradiol subcutaneous pellet implants were formerly available in the United Kingdom and Australia under the brand name Estradiol Implants or Oestradiol Implants (Organon; 25, 50, or 100 mg), but have been discontinued. However, an estradiol subcutaneous implant with the brand name Meno-Implant (Organon; 20 mg) continues to be available in the Netherlands. Previously, for instance in the 1970s and 1980s, other subcutaneous estradiol implant products such as Progynon Pellets (Schering; 25 mg) and Estropel Pellets (25 mg; Bartor Pharmacol) were marketed. It has been said that pharmaceutical estradiol implants have been almost exclusively used in the United Kingdom. Subcutaneous estradiol implants are also available as custom compounded products in some countries.

=== Economics ===
Generic oral estradiol tablets are much less expensive than other forms of estradiol such as transdermal gel and patches and vaginal rings.

== Research ==
A variety of estradiol-containing combined birth control pills were studied but never marketed. In addition, a variety of estradiol-containing combined injectable contraceptives were studied but never marketed.

Estradiol has been studied in the treatment of postpartum depression and postpartum psychosis.

Estrogens such as estradiol appear to improve sexual desire and function in women. However, the available evidence overall does not support the use of estradiol and other estrogens for improving sexual desire and function in women as of 2016. An exception is the use of estrogens to treat vaginal atrophy.

Estrogen therapy has been proposed as a potential treatment for autism but clinical studies are needed.
