= Estradiol-containing birth control =

Estradiol-containing birth control may refer to:

- Estradiol-containing birth control pill
- Combined injectable contraceptive
