= Estradiol-containing birth control pill =

Estradiol-containing oral contraceptive

Background
- Type: Hormonal
- First use: 1993 (Finland)

Pregnancy rates (first year)
- Perfect use: ?
- Typical use: ?

Usage
- Reversibility: Yes
- User reminders: ?

Advantages and disadvantages
- STI protection: No

Combined birth control pills that contain natural estradiol or an estradiol ester (e.g., estradiol valerate) include:

- Estradiol valerate and cyproterone acetate (brand name Femilar) – introduced in Finland (only) in 1993
- Estradiol valerate and dienogest (brand names Qlaira, Natazia) – introduced in Europe in 2009 and the U.S. in 2010
- Estradiol and nomegestrol acetate (brand name Zoely) – introduced in Europe in 2011

Estradiol, mainly as esters including estradiol valerate, estradiol cypionate, and estradiol enanthate, is also the exclusive estrogen used in combined injectable contraceptives.

As of 2021, more than 95% of prescriptions are for combined hormonal birth control forms containing the synthetic estrogen ethinylestradiol (EE). Hence, estradiol-based birth control pills are still not widely used.

== Side effects ==
Birth control pills containing estradiol have less impact on liver protein synthesis than ethinylestradiol-containing birth control pills, and it is thought that for this reason, they may pose less of a risk of venous thromboembolism (VTE). In accordance, although birth control pills containing estradiol valerate/dienogest are associated with a significantly increased risk of VTE, they are associated with a significantly lower risk of venous thromboembolism than birth control pills containing ethinylestradiol and a progestin. The risk of VTE with estradiol/nomegestrol acetate birth control pills is under study.

Incidence of irregular vaginal bleeding may be higher with estradiol-containing birth control pills in relation to the fact that estradiol is a weaker estrogen than ethinylestradiol in the endometrium.

== Pharmacology ==
The pharmacodynamics and pharmacokinetics of estradiol in the context of use in birth control pills have been studied and reviewed.

== Research ==
Experimental estradiol-containing birth control pills that were studied but never marketed include:

- Estradiol/norethisterone (Netagen, Netagen 403)
- Estradiol/estriol/norethisterone (Netagen 423)
- Estradiol/estriol/norethisterone acetate
- Estradiol/desogestrel
- Estradiol cyclooctyl acetate/desogestrel
- Estradiol/ethinylestradiol/dienogest

A large randomized controlled trial of a birth control pill containing ethinylestradiol/norethisterone acetate versus a birth control pill containing estradiol/estriol/norethisterone acetate has been conducted.

== See also ==
- Birth control pill formulations
- Estetrol/drospirenone
