= Estradiol valerate/dienogest =

Combination drug

Estradiol valerate / dienogest

- Estradiol valerate (top) and dienogest (bottom)

Combination of
- Estradiol valerate: Estrogen
- Dienogest: Progestogen

Clinical data
- Trade names: Lafamme, Natazia, Qlaira
- Other names: EV/DNG; SH T00658ID; Bay 86-5027; BAY86-5027
- AHFS/Drugs.com: Professional Drug Facts
- MedlinePlus: a601050
- License data: US DailyMed: Estradiol_and_dienogest
- Pregnancy category: AU: B3; Contraindicated
- Routes of administration: By mouth
- Drug class: Estrogen; Progestogen
- ATC code: G03AB08 (WHO)

Legal status
- Legal status: US: ℞-only

Identifiers
- CAS Number: 307334-58-3
- PubChem CID: 9874560
- KEGG: D10461

Estradiol valerate/dienogest (EV/DNG), sold under the brand names Lafamme, Natazia and Qlaira among others, is a combination product of estradiol valerate, an estrogen, and dienogest, a progestogen, which is used in menopausal hormone therapy in and as a birth control pill to prevent pregnancy in women. It is taken by mouth.

Birth control pills containing EV/DNG are associated with a significantly increased risk of venous thromboembolism. However, they are associated with a significantly lower risk of venous thromboembolism than birth control pills containing ethinylestradiol and a progestin.

== See also ==
- Estradiol valerate/cyproterone acetate
- Estradiol/nomegestrol acetate
- List of combined sex-hormonal preparations
