= PGRMC =

The progesterone receptor membrane components (PGRMCs) refer to the following two receptors:

- Progesterone receptor membrane component 1 (PGRMC1)
- Progesterone receptor membrane component 2 (PGRMC2)

== See also ==
- Membrane progesterone receptor
