= PGRMC1 =

Protein-coding gene in the species Homo sapiens

Identifiers
- Aliases: PGRMC1, HPR6.6, MPR, progesterone receptor membrane component 1, Dap1, IZA, 25-Dx
- External IDs: OMIM: 300435; MGI: 1858305; GeneCards: PGRMC1
Available structures
PDB	Ortholog search: PDBe RCSB
PDB	List of PDB id codes 4X8Y

Gene location (Human)
Chr.	X chromosome (human)
Band	Xq24	Start	119,236,245 bp
Band	Xq24	End	119,244,466 bp

Gene location (Mouse)
Chr.	X chromosome (mouse)
Band	X|X A3.3	Start	35,861,859 bp
Band	X|X A3.3	End	35,869,732 bp
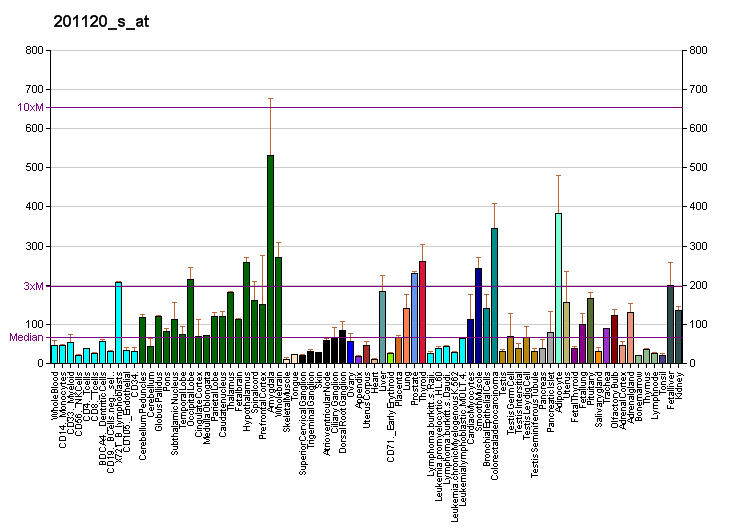

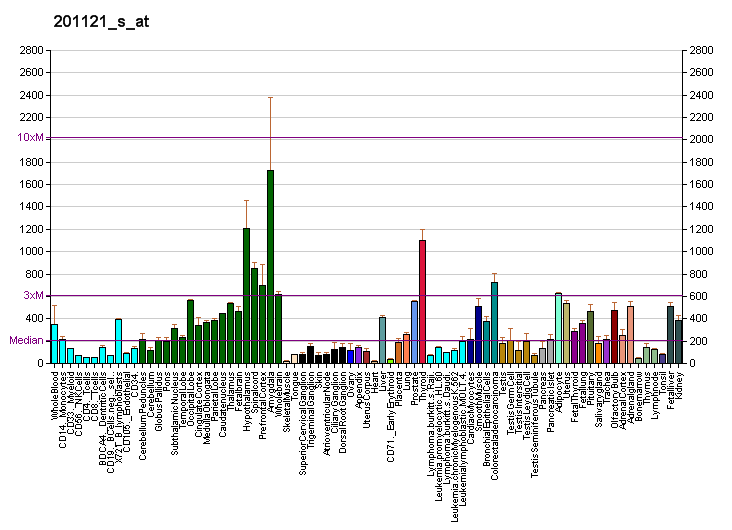
RNA expression pattern
Bgee	Human / Mouse (ortholog); Top expressed in: seminal vesicula; caput epididymis; corpus epididymis; tail of epididymis; bronchial epithelial cell; pons; endometrium; skin of thigh; middle temporal gyrus; pars compacta / Top expressed in: olfactory epithelium; transitional epithelium of urinary bladder; paraventricular nucleus of hypothalamus; arcuate nucleus; ventromedial nucleus; suprachiasmatic nucleus; anterior amygdaloid area; lateral septal nucleus; left lobe of liver; dorsomedial hypothalamic nucleus; More reference expression data
BioGPS	More reference expression data
Gene ontology
Molecular function	steroid binding; protein binding; heme binding; lipid binding; amyloid-beta binding
Cellular component	organelle membrane; integral component of membrane; extracellular exosome; endoplasmic reticulum membrane; endomembrane system; membrane; intracellular membrane-bounded organelle; endoplasmic reticulum; plasma membrane; specific granule membrane; integral component of plasma membrane; smooth endoplasmic reticulum membrane; neuron projection; soma; cell body; synapse
Biological process	neutrophil degranulation
Sources:Amigo / QuickGO
Orthologs
Databases	NCBI: entry; OMA: entry
Species	Human	Mouse
Entrez	10857	53328
Ensembl	ENSG00000101856	ENSMUSG00000006373
UniProt	O00264; Q6IB11	O55022
RefSeq (mRNA)	NM_006667; NM_001282621	NM_016783
RefSeq (protein)	NP_001269550; NP_006658; NP_006658.1	NP_058063
Location (UCSC)	Chr X: 119.24 – 119.24 Mb	Chr X: 35.86 – 35.87 Mb
PubMed search
- Wikidata
View/Edit Human	View/Edit Mouse

Progesterone receptor membrane component 1 (abbreviated PGRMC1) is a protein which co-purifies with progesterone binding proteins in the liver and ovary. In humans, the PGRMC1 protein is encoded by the PGRMC1 gene.

The sole biochemical function of PGRMC1 is heme-binding. PGRMC1 shares key structural motifs with cytochrome b_{5}. PGRMC1 binds and activates P450 proteins, which are important in drug, hormone and lipid metabolism. PGRMC1 also binds to PAIR-BP1 (plasminogen activator inhibitor RNA-binding protein-1). However, its expression outside of the reproductive tract and in males suggests multiple functions for the protein. These may include binding to Insig (insulin-induced gene), which regulates cholesterol synthesis.

== Expression ==
PGRMC1 is highly expressed in the liver and kidney in humans with lower expression in the brain, lung, heart, skeletal muscle and pancreas. In rodents, PGRMC1 is found in the liver, lung, kidney and brain. PGRMC1 is over-expressed in breast tumors and in cancer cell lines from the colon, thyroid, ovary, lung, and cervix. Microarray analyses have detected PGRMC1 expression in colon, lung and breast tumors.

PGRMC1 expression is induced by the non-genotoxic carcinogen 2,3,7,8-tetrachlorodibenzo-p-dioxin in the rat liver, but this induction is specific to males. PGRMC1 is expressed in the ovary and corpus luteum, where its expression is induced by progesterone and during pregnancy, respectively. PGRMC1 is expressed in various regions of the brain (hypothalamic area, circumventricular organs, ependymal cells of the lateral ventricles, meninges), including regions known to facilitate lordosis.

== Binding to heme and cytochrome P450s ==
The PGRMC1 yeast homologue, Dap1 (damage associated protein 1), binds heme through a penta-coordinate mechanism. Yeast cells lacking the DAP1 gene are sensitive to DNA damage, and heme-binding is essential for damage resistance. Dap1 is also required for a critical step in cholesterol synthesis in which the P450 protein Erg11/Cyp51 removes a methyl group from lanosterol. Erg11/Cyp51 is the target of the azole antifungal drugs. As a result, yeast cells lacking the DAP1 gene are highly sensitive to antifungal drugs This function is conserved between the unrelated fungi S. cerevisiae and S. pombe. Dap1 also regulates the metabolism of iron in yeast.

In yeast and humans, PGRMC1 binds directly to P450 proteins, including CYP51A1, CYP3A4, CYP7A1 and CYP21A2. PGRMC1 also activates Cyp21 when the two proteins are co-expressed, indicating that PGRMC1 promotes progesterone turnover. Just as Dap1 is required for the action of Erg11 in the synthesis of ergosterol in yeast, PGRMC1 regulates the Cyp51-catalyzed demethylation step in human cholesterol synthesis. Thus, PGRMC1 and its homologues bind and regulate P450 proteins, and it has been likened to "a helping hand for P450 proteins".

== Roles in signaling and apoptosis ==
The yeast PGRMC1 homologue is required for resistance to damage. PGRMC1 also promotes survival in human cancer cells after treatment with chemotherapy. In contrast, PGRMC1 promotes cell death in cancer cells after oxidative damage. PGRMC1 alters several known survival signaling proteins, including the Akt protein kinase and the cell death-associated protein IκB. Progesterone inhibits apoptosis in immortalized granulosa cells, and this activity requires PGRMC1 and its binding partner, PAIR-BP1 (plasminogen activator inhibitor RNA-binding protein-1). However, PAIR-BP1 is not a progesterone binding protein, and the component of the PGRMC1 complex that binds to progesterone is unknown.

PGRMC1 was originally thought to represent a progesterone receptor of some sort and to bind to progesterone, but subsequently thought has moved towards PGRMC1 acting as a downstream mediator of some other progesterone-binding protein.

== See also ==
- PGRMC
- PGRMC2
- Membrane progesterone receptor
