= Nomegestrol acetate/estradiol =

Combination drug

- Estradiol (top) and nomegestrol acetate (bottom)

Combination of
- Nomegestrol acetate: Progestogen
- Estradiol: Estrogen

Clinical data
- Trade names: Zoely
- Other names: NOMAC-E2, NOMAC/E2, MK-8175A
- AHFS/Drugs.com: UK Drug Information
- Routes of administration: By mouth
- Drug class: Estrogen; Progestogen
- ATC code: G03AA14 (WHO)

Legal status
- Legal status: UK: POM (Prescription only); EU: Rx-only

Identifiers
- CAS Number: 853244-42-5
- PubChem CID: 9895694
- KEGG: D10856

Nomegestrol acetate/estradiol (NOMAC-E2), sold under the brand names Naemis and Zoely among others, is a fixed-dose combination medication of nomegestrol acetate, a progestogen, and estradiol, an estrogen, which is used in menopausal hormone therapy and as a birth control pill to prevent pregnancy in women. It is taken by mouth.

== Research ==
Estradiol-containing birth control pills like NOMAC-E2 may have a lower risk of venous thromboembolism than birth control pills containing ethinylestradiol. This is being studied in the case of NOMAC-E2.

== See also ==
- List of combined sex-hormonal preparations
