= Promestriene =

Chemical compound

Clinical data
- Trade names: Colpotrofin, Colpotrophine, Delipoderm
- Other names: Estradiol 3-propyl 17β-methyl diether; 17β-Methoxy-3-propoxyestra-1,3,5(10)-triene
- Routes of administration: Topical
- Drug class: Estrogen; Estrogen ester
- ATC code: G03CA09 (WHO)

Identifiers
- IUPAC name: (8R,9S,13S,14S)-17-methoxy-13-methyl-3-propoxy-6,7,8,9,11,12,14,15,16,17-decahydrocyclopenta[a]phenanthrene
- CAS Number: 39219-28-8
- PubChem CID: 71717
- ChemSpider: 64767
- UNII: GXM4PER6WZ
- CompTox Dashboard (EPA): DTXSID2057730
- ECHA InfoCard: 100.049.401

Chemical and physical data
- Formula: C_{22}H_{32}O_{2}
- Molar mass: 328.496 g·mol^{−1}
- 3D model (JSmol): Interactive image
- SMILES: CCCOc1ccc2c(c1)CC[C@@H]3[C@@H]2CC[C@]4([C@H]3CCC4OC)C
- InChI: InChI=1S/C22H32O2/c1-4-13-24-16-6-8-17-15(14-16)5-7-19-18(17)11-12-22(2)20(19)9-10-21(22)23-3/h6,8,14,18-21H,4-5,7,9-13H2,1-3H3/t18-,19-,20+,21?,22+/m1/s1; Key:IUWKNLFTJBHTSD-QIKJAYGVSA-N

Promestriene (INN) (brand names Colpotrofin, Colpotrophine, Delipoderm), also known as estradiol 3-propyl 17β-methyl diether, is a synthetic estrogen which is used topically in a 1% cream formulation for the treatment of vaginal atrophy in women. It is the 3-propyl and 17β-methyl diether of estradiol and does not appear to convert into estradiol in the body. Promestriene is minimally absorbed and appears to have negligible systemic estrogenic effect. The drug has been described as a tropic agent and antiseborrheic. It has not been found to be effective in the treatment of pattern hair loss or other conditions of cutaneous androgenization. Promestriene was first introduced in France in 1974 and has been marketed in 34 countries worldwide. It has been used in millions of women.

== See also ==
- List of estrogen esters § Ethers of steroidal estrogens
