= PGRMC2 =

Protein-coding gene in the species Homo sapiens

Identifiers
- Aliases: PGRMC2, DG6, PMBP, progesterone receptor membrane component 2
- External IDs: OMIM: 607735; MGI: 1918054; GeneCards: PGRMC2

Gene location (Human)
Chr.	Chromosome 4 (human)
Band	4q28.2	Start	128,269,237 bp
Band	4q28.2	End	128,288,829 bp

Gene location (Mouse)
Chr.	Chromosome 3 (mouse)
Band	3|3 B	Start	41,020,761 bp
Band	3|3 B	End	41,037,481 bp
RNA expression pattern
Bgee	Human / Mouse (ortholog); Top expressed in: jejunal mucosa; islet of Langerhans; stromal cell of endometrium; epithelium of colon; skin of abdomen; skin of arm; skin of leg; adipose tissue; rectum; abdominal fat / Top expressed in: otic placode; saccule; supraoptic nucleus; otic vesicle; motor neuron; yolk sac; skin of external ear; Epithelium of choroid plexus; seminal vesicula; decidua; More reference expression data
BioGPS	n/a
Gene ontology
Molecular function	steroid hormone receptor activity; steroid binding; heme binding; lipid binding; protein binding
Cellular component	integral component of membrane; nuclear envelope; membrane
Biological process	steroid hormone mediated signaling pathway
Sources:Amigo / QuickGO
Orthologs
Databases	NCBI: entry; OMA: entry
Species	Human	Mouse
Entrez	10424	70804
Ensembl	ENSG00000164040	ENSMUSG00000049940
UniProt	O15173	Q80UU9
RefSeq (mRNA)	NM_006320	NM_027558
RefSeq (protein)	NP_006311	NP_081834
Location (UCSC)	Chr 4: 128.27 – 128.29 Mb	Chr 3: 41.02 – 41.04 Mb
PubMed search
- Wikidata
View/Edit Human	View/Edit Mouse

Progesterone receptor membrane component 2 (abbreviated PGRMC2) is a protein which is encoded by the PGRMC2 gene. It has been detected in the placenta, liver, and spermatozoa, among other areas.

== See also ==
- PGRMC
- PGRMC1
- Membrane progesterone receptor
