= Nomegestrol =

Chemical compound

Clinical data
- Other names: 19-Normegestrol; 6-Methyl-17α-hydroxy-δ^{6}-19-norprogesterone; 17α-Hydroxy-6-methyl-19-norpregna-4,6-diene-3,20-dione
- ATC code: G03DB04 (WHO)

Identifiers
- IUPAC name: (17α)-17-acetyl-17-hydroxy-6-methylestra-4,6-dien-3-one
- CAS Number: 58691-88-6
- PubChem CID: 68783
- ChemSpider: 62024
- UNII: 10F89177CO
- KEGG: D07222
- CompTox Dashboard (EPA): DTXSID80866702

Chemical and physical data
- Formula: C_{21}H_{28}O_{3}
- Molar mass: 328.452 g·mol^{−1}
- 3D model (JSmol): Interactive image
- SMILES: O=C4\C=C3\C(=C/[C@@H]1[C@H](CC[C@@]2([C@@](O)(C(=O)C)CC[C@@H]12)C)[C@H]3CC4)C
- InChI: InChI=1S/C21H28O3/c1-12-10-18-16(15-5-4-14(23)11-17(12)15)6-8-20(3)19(18)7-9-21(20,24)13(2)22/h10-11,15-16,18-19,24H,4-9H2,1-3H3/t15-,16-,18-,19+,20+,21+/m1/s1; Key:KZUIYQJTUIACIG-YBZCJVABSA-N

Nomegestrol (INN), also known as 19-normegestrol, is a steroidal progestin which was patented in 1975 but was never marketed. It is the parent compound of nomegestrol acetate, which is marketed as a progestin.

Nomegestrol shows relatively low affinity for the progesterone receptor, only about 4% of that of progesterone and about 1.6% of that of nomegestrol acetate in one assay.

== See also ==
- Medroxyprogesterone
- Megestrol
