= Transdermal spray =

Device to a place a drug onto the skin

A metered-dose transdermal spray delivers a drug to the skin surface for subsequent transdermal absorption. It functions similarly to other transdermal dosage forms such as patches and gels.

In metered-dose transdermal sprays, a volatile solvent system rapidly dries after application, leaving the drug concentrated in or on the stratum corneum as a reservoir or depot from which it is released over time.

An example of an approved transdermal spray is Evamist (estradiol transdermal spray), indicated for the treatment of moderate to severe vasomotor symptoms due to menopause.
