= SERBP1 =

Protein-coding gene in humans

Identifiers
- Aliases: SERBP1, CHD3IP, HABP4L, PAI-RBP1, PAIRBP1, CGI-55, SERPINE1 mRNA binding protein 1
- External IDs: OMIM: 607378; MGI: 1914120; GeneCards: SERBP1
Available structures
PDB	Ortholog search: PDBe RCSB
PDB	List of PDB id codes 4V6X

Gene location (Human)
Chr.	Chromosome 1 (human)
Band	1p31.3	Start	67,407,810 bp
Band	1p31.3	End	67,430,415 bp

Gene location (Mouse)
Chr.	Chromosome 6 (mouse)
Band	6|6 C1	Start	67,215,160 bp
Band	6|6 C1	End	67,274,720 bp
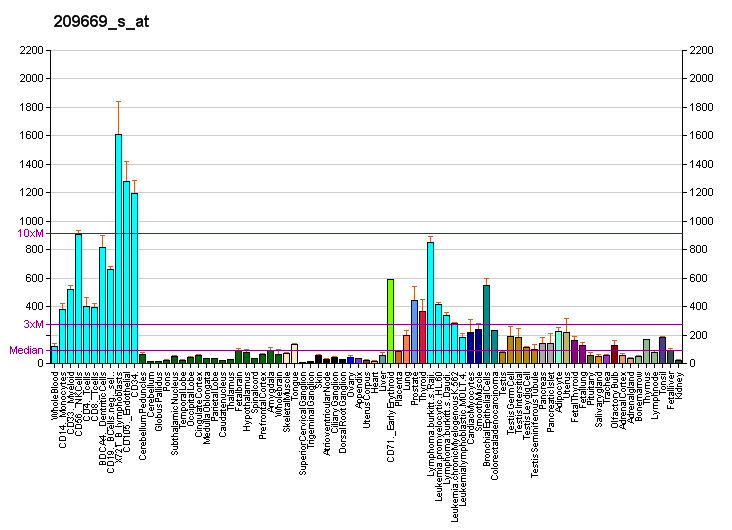

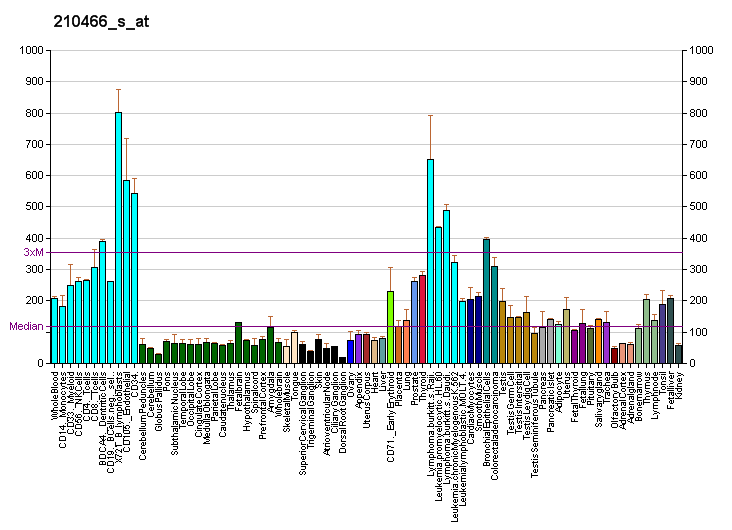

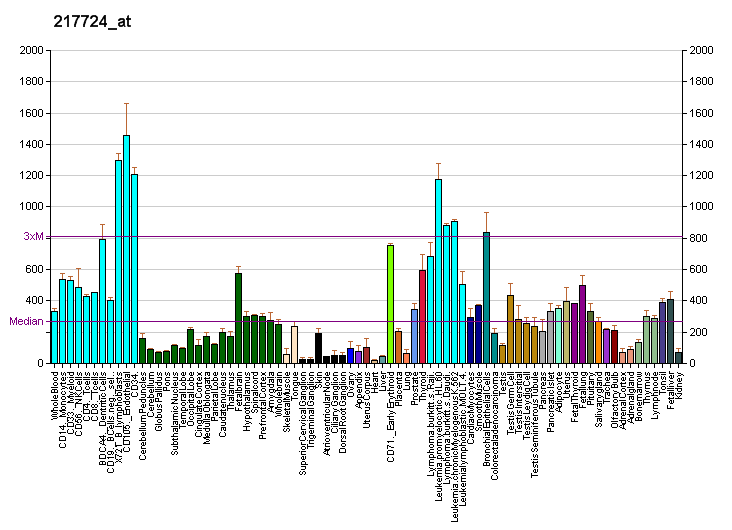
RNA expression pattern
Bgee	Human / Mouse (ortholog); Top expressed in: Skeletal muscle tissue of biceps brachii; Achilles tendon; Skeletal muscle tissue of rectus abdominis; mucosa of sigmoid colon; skin of thigh; trabecular bone; parietal pleura; vulva; triceps brachii muscle; ventricular zone / Top expressed in: primitive streak; tail of embryo; abdominal wall; condyle; Rostral migratory stream; medullary collecting duct; hair follicle; renal corpuscle; endothelial cell of lymphatic vessel; otic placode; More reference expression data
BioGPS	More reference expression data
Gene ontology
Molecular function	protein binding; mRNA 3'-UTR binding; RNA binding; cadherin binding; SUMO binding
Cellular component	perinuclear region of cytoplasm; plasma membrane; extracellular exosome; membrane; cytosol; nucleus; cytoplasm
Biological process	regulation of apoptotic process; regulation of mRNA stability; PML body organization
Sources:Amigo / QuickGO
Orthologs
Databases	NCBI: entry; OMA: entry
Species	Human	Mouse
Entrez	26135	66870
Ensembl	ENSG00000142864	ENSMUSG00000036371
UniProt	Q8NC51	Q9CY58
RefSeq (mRNA)	NM_015640; NM_001018067; NM_001018068; NM_001018069	NM_001113564; NM_001113565; NM_001113566; NM_025814
RefSeq (protein)	NP_001018077; NP_001018078; NP_001018079; NP_056455	NP_001107036; NP_001107037; NP_001107038; NP_080090
Location (UCSC)	Chr 1: 67.41 – 67.43 Mb	Chr 6: 67.22 – 67.27 Mb
PubMed search
- Wikidata
View/Edit Human	View/Edit Mouse

Plasminogen activator inhibitor 1 RNA-binding protein (serbp1) is a protein that in humans is encoded by the SERBP1 gene.

== Interactions ==
SERBP1 has been shown to interact with CHD3.
