= Estradiol valerate/cyproterone acetate =

Combination drug

Estradiol valerate / cyproterone acetate

- Estradiol valerate (top) and cyproterone acetate (bottom)

Combination of
- Estradiol valerate: Estrogen
- Cyproterone acetate: Progestogen

Clinical data
- Trade names: Climen, Femilar
- Other names: EV/CPA
- Routes of administration: By mouth
- Drug class: Estrogen; Progestogen

Legal status
- Legal status: US: ℞-only

Identifiers
- CAS Number: 108116-22-9

Estradiol valerate/cyproterone acetate (EV/CPA), sold under the brand names Climen and Femilar among others, is a combination product of estradiol valerate (EV), an estrogen, and cyproterone acetate (CPA), a progestogen, which is used in menopausal hormone therapy and as a birth control pill to prevent pregnancy. It is taken by mouth. Climen, which is used in menopausal hormone therapy, is a sequential preparation that contains 2 mg estradiol valerate and 1 mg CPA. It was the first product for use in menopausal hormone therapy containing CPA to be marketed and is available in more than 40 countries. Femilar, which is an estradiol-containing birth control pill, contains 1 to 2 mg estradiol valerate and 1 to 2 mg CPA, and has been approved for use in Finland since 1993.

CPA alone has been found to suppress ovulation in 3 of 5 women at a dose of 0.5 mg/day and in 5 of 5 women at a dose of 1 mg/day. Ovulation inhibition with Femilar occurred in 94.4% of 108 women during the third treatment cycle in one study and in almost 100% of 26 women over 12 treatment cycles in another study (except for one woman who ovulated during her first treatment cycle).

== See also ==
- Ethinylestradiol/cyproterone acetate
- List of combined sex-hormonal preparations
