= C21H26O3 =

The molecular formula C_{21}H_{26}O_{3} (molar mass: 326.42 g/mol, exact mass: 326.1882 u) may refer to:

- Acitretin
- Buparvaquone
- Moxestrol
- Octabenzone
- RU-16117
- 11-Hydroxycannabinol
