= 11β-Chloromethylestradiol =

Chemical compound

Clinical data
- Other names: 11β-CME2; CME; ORG-4333; 11β-(Chloromethyl)estra-1,3,5(10)-trien-3,17β-diol
- Drug class: Estrogen

Identifiers
- IUPAC name: (8S,9R,11S,13S,14S,17S)-11-(chloromethyl)-13-methyl-6,7,8,9,11,12,14,15,16,17-decahydrocyclopenta[a]phenanthrene-3,17-diol
- CAS Number: 71794-60-0
- PubChem CID: 67088
- ChemSpider: 60438
- UNII: BRP4DW4SEE
- KEGG: C14307
- ChEBI: CHEBI:34142
- CompTox Dashboard (EPA): DTXSID40992450

Chemical and physical data
- Formula: C_{19}H_{25}ClO_{2}
- Molar mass: 320.86 g·mol^{−1}
- 3D model (JSmol): Interactive image
- SMILES: C[C@]12C[C@@H]([C@H]3[C@H]([C@@H]1CC[C@@H]2O)CCC4=C3C=CC(=C4)O)CCl
- InChI: InChI=1S/C19H25ClO2/c1-19-9-12(10-20)18-14-5-3-13(21)8-11(14)2-4-15(18)16(19)6-7-17(19)22/h3,5,8,12,15-18,21-22H,2,4,6-7,9-10H2,1H3/t12-,15+,16+,17+,18-,19+/m1/s1; Key:CADGCTOWBAPSFQ-OQFXVXKWSA-N

11β-Chloromethylestradiol (11β-CME2; developmental code name ORG-4333) is a synthetic steroidal estrogen which was never marketed. It has very high affinity for the estrogen receptor and dissociates from it relatively slowly. It was originally thought that 11β-CME2 might be a covalent ligand of the estrogen receptors, but its binding was subsequently shown to be fully reversible. The relative binding affinity of 11β-CME2 for the estrogen receptors ranges from 230 to 3,320% of that of estradiol depending on the study. 11β-CME2 also has about 14% of the relative binding affinity of estradiol for sex hormone-binding globulin (SHBG). The compound has been developed as a radiolabel for the ERs.

== See also ==
- 11β-Methoxyestradiol
- Moxestrol
