= 11β-Methoxyestradiol =

Chemical compound

Clinical data
- Other names: 11β-MeOE2; 11βOMeEST; RU-2504; 11β-Methoxyestra-1,3,5(10)-triene-3,17β-diol
- Drug class: Estrogen

Identifiers
- IUPAC name: (8S,9S,11S,13S,14S,17S)-11-methoxy-13-methyl-6,7,8,9,11,12,14,15,16,17-decahydrocyclopenta[a]phenanthrene-3,17-diol
- CAS Number: 21507-14-2
- PubChem CID: 68568
- ChemSpider: 61838
- UNII: R3M9HHJ34D
- ChEMBL: ChEMBL368703
- CompTox Dashboard (EPA): DTXSID80878441

Chemical and physical data
- Formula: C_{19}H_{26}O_{3}
- Molar mass: 302.414 g·mol^{−1}
- 3D model (JSmol): Interactive image
- SMILES: C[C@]12C[C@@H]([C@H]3[C@H]([C@@H]1CC[C@@H]2O)CCC4=C3C=CC(=C4)O)OC
- InChI: InChI=1S/C19H26O3/c1-19-10-16(22-2)18-13-6-4-12(20)9-11(13)3-5-14(18)15(19)7-8-17(19)21/h4,6,9,14-18,20-21H,3,5,7-8,10H2,1-2H3/t14-,15-,16-,17-,18+,19-/m0/s1; Key:OAHDOJSNKCCHJM-VIUKOLAESA-N

11β-Methoxyestradiol (11β-MeOE2; developmental code name RU-2504) is a synthetic steroidal estrogen which was never marketed. It has about 86% of the relative binding affinity of estradiol for the estrogen receptor. 11β-MeOE2 is structurally related to moxestrol (11β-methoxy-17α-ethynylestradiol). 11β-MeOE2 and moxestrol are substantially more potent than their non-methoxylated analogues (estradiol and ethinylestradiol, respectively) in mice.

== See also ==
- Moxestrol
- 11β-Chloromethylestradiol
