= Ethinylestradiol sulfate =

Chemical compound

Clinical data
- Other names: EE sulfate; 17α-Ethynylestradiol 3-sulfate
- Drug class: Estrogen; Estrogen ester

Identifiers
- IUPAC name: [(8R,9S,13S,14S,17R)-17-Ethynyl-17-hydroxy-13-methyl-7,8,9,11,12,14,15,16-octahydro-6H-cyclopenta[a]phenanthren-3-yl] hydrogen sulfate
- CAS Number: 24560-70-1
- PubChem CID: 68575
- ChemSpider: 61845
- UNII: 67P0FM71OZ
- ChEBI: CHEBI:136600
- ChEMBL: ChEMBL1614648
- CompTox Dashboard (EPA): DTXSID80873219

Chemical and physical data
- Formula: C_{20}H_{24}O_{5}S
- Molar mass: 376.47 g·mol^{−1}
- 3D model (JSmol): Interactive image
- SMILES: C[C@]12CC[C@H]3[C@H]([C@@H]1CC[C@]2(C#C)O)CCC4=C3C=CC(=C4)OS(=O)(=O)O
- InChI: InChI=1S/C20H24O5S/c1-3-20(21)11-9-18-17-6-4-13-12-14(25-26(22,23)24)5-7-15(13)16(17)8-10-19(18,20)2/h1,5,7,12,16-18,21H,4,6,8-11H2,2H3,(H,22,23,24)/t16-,17-,18+,19+,20+/m1/s1; Key:WLGIWVFFGMPRLM-SLHNCBLASA-N

Ethinylestradiol sulfate (EE sulfate), also known as 17α-ethynylestradiol 3-sulfate, is an estrogen ester – specifically, the C3 sulfuric acid (sulfate) ester of the synthetic estrogen ethinylestradiol (EE) – and is the major metabolite of EE. Circulating levels of EE sulfate range from 6 to 22 times those of EE when EE is taken orally. EE sulfate can be transformed back into EE (14–21%) via steroid sulfatase, and it has been suggested that EE sulfate may serve as a circulating reservoir for EE, similarly to the case of estrone sulfate with estradiol. However, the EE sulfate pool with EE is far smaller than the pool of estrone sulfate that occurs with estradiol (with estrone sulfate levels approximately 200-fold higher than estradiol levels on average with oral estradiol). In addition, in contrast to the case of estrone sulfate and estrone, the conversion rate of EE sulfate back into EE is relatively low, and has been said probably isn't of clinical significance. However, other studies have suggested that EE sulfate may nonetheless contribute up to 20% of total EE levels.

== See also ==
- List of estrogen esters § Esters of other steroidal estrogens
