= RU-16117 =

Chemical compound

Clinical data
- Other names: 11α-Methoxyethinylestradiol; 11α-Methoxy-17α-ethynylestradiol; 11α-Methoxy-19-nor-17α-pregna-1,3,5(10)-trien-20-yne-3,17-diol
- Routes of administration: By mouth
- Drug class: Estrogen; Estrogen ether

Identifiers
- IUPAC name: (8S,9S,11R,13S,14S,17R)-17-Ethynyl-11-methoxy-13-methyl-7,8,9,11,12,14,15,16-octahydro-6H-cyclopenta[a]phenanthrene-3,17-diol
- CAS Number: 61665-15-4
- PubChem CID: 66408
- ChemSpider: 59782
- UNII: MC34LNC8JG
- CompTox Dashboard (EPA): DTXSID60977244

Chemical and physical data
- Formula: C_{21}H_{26}O_{3}
- Molar mass: 326.436 g·mol^{−1}
- 3D model (JSmol): Interactive image
- SMILES: C[C@]12C[C@H]([C@H]3[C@H]([C@@H]1CC[C@]2(C#C)O)CCC4=C3C=CC(=C4)O)OC
- InChI: InChI=1S/C21H26O3/c1-4-21(23)10-9-17-16-7-5-13-11-14(22)6-8-15(13)19(16)18(24-3)12-20(17,21)2/h1,6,8,11,16-19,22-23H,5,7,9-10,12H2,2-3H3/t16-,17-,18+,19+,20-,21-/m0/s1; Key:MTMZZIPTQITGCY-QHOCJJNXSA-N

RU-16117 is an estrogen medication which was investigated for the potential treatment of symptoms of estrogen deficiency such as hot flashes and osteoporosis in women but was never marketed. It was developed for use by mouth.

== Pharmacology ==
=== Pharmacodynamics ===
RU-16117 is an estrogen, or an agonist of the estrogen receptor (ER). In mouse uterine tissue, it shows about 5 to 13% of the affinity of estradiol for the ER and about 1% of the estrogenic activity of estradiol. Conversely, it shows no affinity for the androgen, progesterone, glucocorticoid, and mineralocorticoid receptors, nor any activities associated with interactions with these receptors. While the association rate of RU-16117 to the ER is the same as that of moxestrol, it dissociates from the ER extremely rapidly at rates of about three times faster than estradiol and about 20 times faster than moxestrol. This is similar to the case of estriol, which RU-16117 is described as sharing similarities with. RU-16117 is described as a weak or partial estrogen or a mixed estrogen/antiestrogen. It has been described as having highly active antiestrogenic activity with very weak uterotrophic activity. However, higher doses and/or prolonged administration of RU-16117 have been reported to induce equivalent estrogenic responses relative to estradiol and moxestrol.

Relative affinities (%) of RU-16117 and related steroids
Compound	PR	AR	ER	GR	MR	SHBG	CBG
Estradiol	2.6	7.9	100	0.6	0.13	8.7	<0.1
Estriol	?	?	15	?	?	?	?
Ethinylestradiol	15–25	1–3	112	1–3	<1	?	?
Moxestrol (11β-MeO-EE)	0.8	<0.1	12	3.2	<0.1	<0.2	<0.1
RU-16117 (11α-MeO-EE)	1–3	<1	13	<1	<1	?	?
Values are percentages (%). Reference ligands (100%) were progesterone for the PR, testosterone for the AR, E2 for the ER, DEXA for the GR, aldosterone for the MR, DHT for SHBG, and cortisol for CBG.

== Chemistry ==
RU-16117, also known as 11α-methoxy-17α-ethynylestradiol (11α-MeO-EE) or as 11α-methoxy-17α-ethynylestra-1,3,5(10)-triene-3,17β-diol, is a synthetic estrane steroid and a derivative of estradiol. It is specifically a derivative of ethinylestradiol (17α-ethynylestradiol) with a methoxy group at the C11α position. The compound is the C11α isomer or C11 epimer of moxestrol (11β-methoxy-17α-ethynylestradiol).

== Synthesis ==

RU-16117 is derived from Δ9,11-dehydroestradiol (1). Its two hydroxy groups are first protected by the formation of benzyl ethers, giving (2) and the isolated double bond is hydrated by hydroboration, followed by oxidation with hydrogen peroxide in alkali to give (3). The newly-introduced alcohol is methylated with iodomethane to produce (4). After removal of the protecting groups by catalytic hydrogenation to form (5), the hydroxyl group in the five-membered ring is oxidized to a ketone with chromium trioxide and the product, (6), is reacted with potassium acetylide to introduce the acetylide group of the drug.
