= Erythema nodosum et multiforme =

Skin condition set index

Erythema nodosum et multiforme is a type of erythema (skin redness) and refers to:

- Erythema nodosum (EN)
- Erythema multiforme (EM)
