= Ethinylestradiol =

Estrogen medication

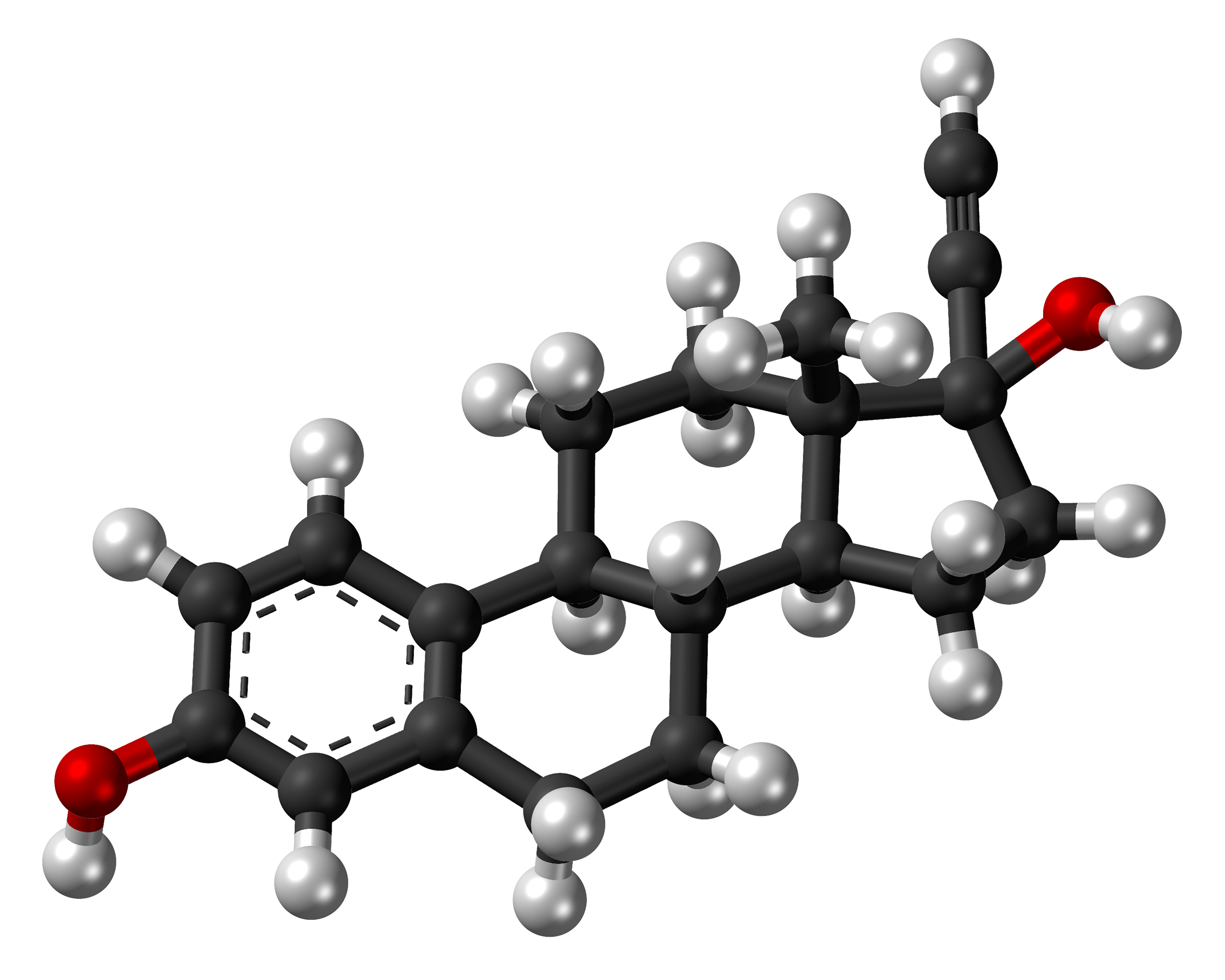

Clinical data
- Pronunciation: /ˌɛθɪnɪlˌɛstrəˈdaɪ.əl/
- Other names: Ethynylestradiol; ethinyl estradiol; ethinyl oestradiol; EE; EE2; 17α-ethynylestradiol; 17α-ethynylestra-1,3,5(10)-triene-3,17β-diol; NSC-10973
- AHFS/Drugs.com: Consumer Drug Information
- MedlinePlus: a604032
- Routes of administration: By mouth, transdermal, vaginal
- Drug class: Estrogen
- ATC code: G03CA01 (WHO) L02AA03 (WHO)

Legal status
- Legal status: In general: ℞ (Prescription only)

Pharmacokinetic data
- Bioavailability: 38–48%
- Protein binding: 97–98% (to albumin; is not bound to SHBG)
- Metabolism: Liver (primarily CYP3A4)
- Metabolites: • Ethinylestradiol sulfate • Others
- Elimination half-life: 7–36 hours
- Excretion: Feces: 62% Urine: 38%

Identifiers
- IUPAC name: (8R,9S,13S,14S,17R)-17-ethynyl-13-methyl-7,8,9,11,12,14,15,16-octahydro-6H-cyclopenta[a]phenanthrene-4,17-diol
- CAS Number: 57-63-6
- PubChem CID: 5991
- IUPHAR/BPS: 7071
- DrugBank: DB00977
- ChemSpider: 5770
- UNII: 423D2T571U
- KEGG: D00554
- ChEBI: CHEBI:4903
- ChEMBL: ChEMBL691
- CompTox Dashboard (EPA): DTXSID5020576
- ECHA InfoCard: 100.000.311

Chemical and physical data
- Formula: C_{20}H_{24}O_{2}
- Molar mass: 296.410 g·mol^{−1}
- 3D model (JSmol): Interactive image
- Melting point: 182 to 184 °C (360 to 363 °F)
- SMILES: Oc1cc4c(cc1)[C@H]3CC[C@]2([C@@H](CC[C@]2(C#C)O)[C@@H]3CC4)C
- InChI: InChI=1S/C20H24O2/c1-3-20(22)11-9-18-17-6-4-13-12-14(21)5-7-15(13)16(17)8-10-19(18,20)2/h1,5,7,12,16-18,21-22H,4,6,8-11H2,2H3/t16-,17-,18+,19+,20+/m1/s1; Key:BFPYWIDHMRZLRN-SLHNCBLASA-N

Ethinylestradiol (EE) is an estrogen medication which is used widely in birth control pills in combination with progestins. Ethinylestradiol is widely used for various indications such as the treatment of menopausal symptoms, gynecological disorders, and certain hormone-sensitive cancers. It is usually taken by mouth but is also used as a patch and vaginal ring.

The general side effects of ethinylestradiol include breast tenderness and enlargement, headache, fluid retention, and nausea among others. In males, ethinylestradiol can additionally cause breast development, feminization in general, hypogonadism, and sexual dysfunction. Rare but serious side effects include blood clots, liver damage, and cancer of the uterus.

Ethinylestradiol is an estrogen, or an agonist of the estrogen receptors, the biological target of estrogens like estradiol. It is a synthetic derivative of estradiol, a natural estrogen, and differs from it in various ways. Compared to estradiol, ethinylestradiol is more resistant to metabolism, has greatly improved bioavailability when taken by mouth, and shows relatively increased effects in certain parts of the body like the liver and uterus. These differences make ethinylestradiol more favorable for use in birth control pills than estradiol, though also result in an increased risk of blood clots and certain other rare adverse effects.

Ethinylestradiol was developed in the 1930s and was introduced for medical use in 1943. The medication started being used in birth control pills in the 1960s. Ethinylestradiol is found in almost all combined forms of birth control pills and is nearly the exclusive estrogen used for this purpose, making it one of the most widely used estrogens. In 2023, the combination with norethisterone was the 79th most commonly prescribed medication in the United States with more than 8 million prescriptions. Fixed-dose combination medications containing ethinylestradiol with other hormones are available.

== Medical uses ==
Ethinylestradiol is most commonly used as contraception in combined oral contraceptives (COC), also known as birth control, to prevent pregnancy after sex. Ethinylestradiol in its birth control formulation is not only used to prevent pregnancy, but can also be used to treat absence of menstruation, symptoms during menstruation, and acne.

Ethinylestradiol is also used as menopausal hormone therapy. The main reason for using HRT in menopausal women is to relieve common vasomotor symptoms such as hot flashes, night sweats, and flushing. Studies have found that estrogen replacement helps improve these symptoms when compared to a placebo. Other common menopause symptoms, such as vaginal dryness (which can cause pain during sexual intercourse), vaginal itching, and depressed mood, can benefit from HRT. In addition to treatment of menopausal symptoms, ethinylestradiol has been used as a component of feminizing hormone therapy for transgender women. However, it is no longer commonly used nor recommended for this purpose, with bioidentical estradiol having largely superseded it due to its increased safety and efficacy.

Ethinylestradiol can also be used to treat hypogonadism in women, prevent osteoporosis in women, and has been used as palliative care for prostate cancer in men and breast cancer in women. It has also been used to reduce sex drive in sex offenders.

Ethinylestradiol or any estrogen alone is contraindicated for women who have a uterus due to the increased risk of endometrial cancer; giving a progestogen with an estrogen mitigates the risk.

=== Available forms ===
Ethinylestradiol is available in combination with a progestin in a vast number of combined oral contraceptives. It is also available in combination with progestins as a transdermal contraceptive patch and as a contraceptive vaginal ring. In addition, there is a single preparation (brand name FemHRT) containing very low doses of ethinylestradiol (2.5 and 5 μg) plus a progestin in an oral tablet that remains in use for menopausal hormone therapy. Ethinylestradiol was previously available by itself under brand names like Estinyl and Lynoral in the form of 0.002, 0.01, 0.02, 0.025, 0.05, 0.1, 0.5, and 1.0 mg (2, 10, 20, 25, 50, 100, 500, and 1000 μg) tablets.

The amount of ethinylestradiol in combined oral contraceptives has reduced over the years. Previously, combined oral contraceptives contained high doses of ethinylestradiol of as much as 100 μg/day. Doses of more than 50 μg ethinylestradiol are considered high-dose, doses of 30 and 35 μg ethinylestradiol are considered low-dose, and doses of 10 to 25 μg ethinylestradiol are considered very low dose. Combined oral contraceptives generally contain 10 to 50 μg ethinylestradiol. The higher doses of ethinylestradiol were discontinued due to a high risk of venous thromboembolism and cardiovascular problems.

== Contraindications ==
Ethinylestradiol should be avoided in individuals with a history of or known susceptibility to arterial or venous thrombosis (blood clots), due to an increased risk of cardiovascular problems such as venous thromboembolism (VTE), myocardial infarction, and ischemic stroke. This includes women with:

- History of deep vein thrombosis (DVT) or pulmonary embolism (PE) not receiving anticoagulants
- Acute DVT/PE
- Prolonged immobilization due to major surgery
- Advanced diabetes mellitus with vascular disease
- Migraine with aura
- Hypertension ≥160/100
- Vascular disease
- Current and history of ischemic heart disease
- Multiple risk factors for atherosclerotic cardiovascular disease (e.g. older age, smoking, diabetes, hypertension, low HDL, high LDL, or high triglyceride levels)
- Age ≥35 and smoking ≥15 cigarettes/day
- History of cerebrovascular accident
- Systemic lupus erythematosus with positive (or unknown) antiphospholipid antibodies
- Complicated valvular heart disease

Except when being used to treat it, ethinylestradiol should be avoided in women with current breast cancer due to a possible worsening of prognosis.

Ethinylestradiol should also be avoided in breastfeeding women who are less than 21 days postpartum due to an increased risk of venous thromboembolism. Ethinylestradiol use in breastfeeding women who are at least 21 days postpartum should be discussed with a provider and include information on the advantages, disadvantages, and alternatives for using ethinylestradiol.

Due to risk of cholestatic hepatotoxicity, it is widely considered that combined oral contraceptives containing ethinylestradiol should be avoided in women with a history of cholestasis of pregnancy, hepatic tumors, active hepatitis, and familial defects in biliary excretion.

== Side effects ==
Dose of ethinylestradiol in birth control pills and risk of venous thromboembolism (VTE)
Ethinylestradiol dose	No. of VTE cases	Woman-years	VTE rate	Adjusted RR^{a}
Low (<50 μg)	53	127,000	4.2 in 10,000 woman-years	1.0
Intermediate (50 μg)	69	98,000	7.0 in 10,000 woman-years	1.5
High (>50 μg)	20	20,000	10.0 in 10,000 woman-years	1.7
All	142	245,000	5.8 in 10,000 woman-years	–
Footnotes: ^{a} = Relative to low-dose (not to non-use). Notes: In birth control pills containing a first-generation progestin, such as norethisterone or levonorgestrel. Sources: Main: Additional:

The severity of side effects can vary based on the dose and administration route of ethinylestradiol. General side effects of ethinylestradiol are the same as for other estrogens and include breast tenderness, headache, fluid retention (bloating), nausea, dizziness, and weight gain. The estrogen component of oral contraceptives, which is almost always ethinylestradiol, can cause breast tenderness and fullness. In males, ethinylestradiol has additional side effects, including gynecomastia (breast development), feminization in general, hypogonadism, infertility, and sexual dysfunction (e.g., reduced libido and erectile dysfunction). In men who received high-dose estrogen therapy with 200 μg/day oral ethinylestradiol for more than three months, gynecomastia occurred in 98% and decreased libido occurred in 42 to 73%.

=== Long-term effects ===
Beneficial and adverse effects of ethinylestradiol-containing birth control pills
Beneficial effects		Adverse effects	
Disease	RR	Disease	RR
Iron-deficiency anemia	0.58	Cardiovascular diseases (total)	1.5
Menorrhagia	0.52	Myocardial infarction (heart attack) (total)	3.3
Irregular menstruation	0.65	Myocardial infarction (non-smokers)	1.0
Intermenstrual bleeding	0.72	Myocardial infarction (light smokers)	3.5
Dysmenorrhea	0.37	Myocardial infarction (heavy smokers)	20
Pelvic inflammatory disease (incidence)	0.50	Cerebrovascular diseases (total)	1.4
Pelvic inflammatory disease (hospitalization)	0.22	Cerebral thromboses (strokes)	2.5
Trichomonas vaginitis	0.56	Subarachnoidal bleeding (heavy smokers)	10
Benign breast disease	0.69	Pulmonary embolism	3.0
Fibrocystic breast disease	0.66	Deep vein thromboses	2.5
Benign breast fibroadenomas	0.35	Gall-bladder diseases	3.0
Rheumatoid arthritis	0.49	Benign liver tumors	50
Endometrial cancer	0.40–0.50	Hepatocellular carcinoma	3.0
Ovarian cancer (incidence)	0.37–0.64	Erythema nodosum et multiforme	3.0
Ovarian cancer (death)	0.20	Pruritus (itching)	2.0
Benign follicular cysts (high-dose combined oral contraceptives)	0.24	Photosensitive eczema	4.0
Acne vulgaris	0.44	Irritant agent eczema	2.0
Low bone mineral density (later in life)	0.35^{a}	Dermatitis (eczema)	2.0
Ectopic pregnancy	0.19	Chloasma (melasma)	1.5
		Cervicitis (6 years of use)	3.0
		Chlamydia infections	2.5
Footnotes: ^{a} = Odds ratio. Sources:

==== Blood clots ====
Venous thromboembolism is a blood clot in a vein, and includes deep vein thrombosis (DVT) and pulmonary embolism (PE). Estrogens are known to increase the risk of venous thromboembolism due to their effects on liver synthesis of coagulation factors. Ethinylestradiol carries a greater risk of blood clot formation and venous thromboembolism than does natural estradiol, which is thought to be due to structural differences between the two compounds and different susceptibilities to liver inactivation.

A 2012 meta-analysis estimated that the absolute risk of venous thromboembolism is 2 per 10,000 women for non-use, 8 per 10,000 women for ethinylestradiol and levonorgestrel-containing birth control pills, and 10 to 15 per 10,000 women for birth control pills containing ethinylestradiol and a third- or fourth-generation progestin such as desogestrel or drospirenone. For comparison, the absolute risk of venous thromboembolism is generally estimated as 1 to 5 per 10,000 woman–years for non-use, 5 to 20 per 10,000 woman–years for pregnancy, and 40 to 65 per 10,000 woman–years for the postpartum period. Combined oral contraceptives are associated with about a 2- to 4-fold higher risk of venous thromboembolism than non-use. The route of administration of ethinylestradiol does not appear to influence venous thromboembolism risk, as ethinylestradiol/progestin-containing contraceptive vaginal rings and contraceptive patches have the same or even higher risk of venous thromboembolism than combined oral contraceptives. Pregnancy is associated with about a 4.3-fold increase in risk of venous thromboembolism. It has been estimated that at least 300 to 400 healthy young women die each year in the United States due to venous thromboembolism caused by ethinylestradiol-containing birth control pills.

Combined oral contraceptives contain 10 to 35 μg ethinylestradiol, but typically 20, 30, or 35 μg. The initial formulations of combined oral contraceptives that were introduced in the 1960s contained 100 to 150 μg ethinylestradiol. However, it was soon found that ethinylestradiol is associated with increased risk of venous thromboembolism and that the risk is dose-dependent. Following these events, the dose of ethinylestradiol was greatly reduced, and is now always less than 50 μg. These lower doses have a significantly reduced risk of venous thromboembolism with no loss of contraceptive effectiveness. Gerstman et al. (1991) found that combined oral contraceptives containing more than 50 μg ethinylestradiol had 1.7-fold and combined oral contraceptives containing 50 μg ethinylestradiol 1.5-fold the risk of venous thromboembolism of combined oral contraceptives containing less than 50 μg. A 2014 Cochrane review found that combined oral contraceptives containing 50 μg ethinylestradiol with levonorgestrel had 2.1- to 2.3-fold the risk of combined oral contraceptives containing 30 μg or 20 μg ethinylestradiol with levonorgestrel, respectively. combined oral contraceptives containing 20 μg ethinylestradiol are likewise associated with a significantly lower risk of cardiovascular events than combined oral contraceptives containing 30 or 40 μg ethinylestradiol. However, discontinuation of combined oral contraceptives is more common with doses of ethinylestradiol from 10 to 20 μg due to problematic changes in bleeding patterns.

Women with thrombophilia have a dramatically higher risk of venous thromboembolism with ethinylestradiol-containing contraception than women without thrombophilia. Depending on the condition, risk of venous thromboembolism can be increased 5- to 50-fold relative to non-use in such women.

Sex hormone-binding globulin (SHBG) levels indicate hepatic estrogenic exposure and may be a surrogate marker for coagulation and venous thromboembolism risk with estrogen therapy, although this topic has been debated. SHBG levels with birth control pills containing different progestins are increased by 1.5 to 2-fold with levonorgestrel, 2.5- to 4-fold with desogestrel and gestodene, 3.5- to 4-fold with drospirenone and dienogest, and 4- to 5-fold with cyproterone acetate. Contraceptive vaginal rings and contraceptive patches likewise have been found to increase SHBG levels by 2.5-fold and 3.5-fold, respectively. Birth control pills containing high doses of ethinylestradiol (>50 μg) can increase SHBG levels by 5- to 10-fold, which is similar to the increase that occurs during pregnancy. Conversely, increases in SHBG levels are much lower with estradiol, especially when used parenterally. High-dose parenteral polyestradiol phosphate therapy has been found to increase SHBG levels by about 1.5-fold.

Risk of venous thromboembolism (VTE) with hormone therapy and birth control (QResearch/CPRD)
Type	Route	Medications	Odds ratio (95% CI)
Menopausal hormone therapy	Oral	Estradiol alone ≤1 mg/day >1 mg/day	1.27 (1.16–1.39)*; 1.22 (1.09–1.37)*; 1.35 (1.18–1.55)*
Menopausal hormone therapy	Oral	Conjugated estrogens alone ≤0.625 mg/day >0.625 mg/day	1.49 (1.39–1.60)*; 1.40 (1.28–1.53)*; 1.71 (1.51–1.93)*
Menopausal hormone therapy	Oral	Estradiol/medroxyprogesterone acetate	1.44 (1.09–1.89)*
Menopausal hormone therapy	Oral	Estradiol/dydrogesterone ≤1 mg/day E2 >1 mg/day E2	1.18 (0.98–1.42); 1.12 (0.90–1.40); 1.34 (0.94–1.90)
Menopausal hormone therapy	Oral	Estradiol/norethisterone ≤1 mg/day E2 >1 mg/day E2	1.68 (1.57–1.80)*; 1.38 (1.23–1.56)*; 1.84 (1.69–2.00)*
Menopausal hormone therapy	Oral	Estradiol/norgestrel or estradiol/drospirenone	1.42 (1.00–2.03)
Menopausal hormone therapy	Oral	Conjugated estrogens/medroxyprogesterone acetate	2.10 (1.92–2.31)*
Menopausal hormone therapy	Oral	Conjugated estrogens/norgestrel ≤0.625 mg/day CEEs >0.625 mg/day CEEs	1.73 (1.57–1.91)*; 1.53 (1.36–1.72)*; 2.38 (1.99–2.85)*
Menopausal hormone therapy	Oral	Tibolone alone	1.02 (0.90–1.15)
Menopausal hormone therapy	Oral	Raloxifene alone	1.49 (1.24–1.79)*
Menopausal hormone therapy	Transdermal	Estradiol alone ≤50 μg/day >50 μg/day	0.96 (0.88–1.04); 0.94 (0.85–1.03); 1.05 (0.88–1.24)
Menopausal hormone therapy	Transdermal	Estradiol/progestogen	0.88 (0.73–1.01)
Menopausal hormone therapy	Vaginal	Estradiol alone	0.84 (0.73–0.97)
Menopausal hormone therapy	Vaginal	Conjugated estrogens alone	1.04 (0.76–1.43)
Combined birth control	Oral	Ethinylestradiol/norethisterone	2.56 (2.15–3.06)*
Combined birth control	Oral	Ethinylestradiol/levonorgestrel	2.38 (2.18–2.59)*
Combined birth control	Oral	Ethinylestradiol/norgestimate	2.53 (2.17–2.96)*
Combined birth control	Oral	Ethinylestradiol/desogestrel	4.28 (3.66–5.01)*
Combined birth control	Oral	Ethinylestradiol/gestodene	3.64 (3.00–4.43)*
Combined birth control	Oral	Ethinylestradiol/drospirenone	4.12 (3.43–4.96)*
Combined birth control	Oral	Ethinylestradiol/cyproterone acetate	4.27 (3.57–5.11)*
Notes: (1) Nested case–control studies (2015, 2019) based on data from the QResearch and Clinical Practice Research Datalink (CPRD) databases. (2) Bioidentical progesterone was not included, but is known to be associated with no additional risk relative to estrogen alone. Footnotes: * = Statistically significant (p < 0.01). Sources: See template.

==== Cardiovascular issues ====
When used orally at high dosages, for instance as a form of high-dose estrogen therapy in men with prostate cancer and in women with breast cancer, synthetic and non-bioidentical estrogens like ethinylestradiol and diethylstilbestrol are associated with fairly high rates of severe cardiovascular complications such as venous thromboembolism, myocardial infarction, and stroke. Diethylstilbestrol has been associated with an up to 35% risk of cardiovascular toxicity and death and a 15% incidence of venous thromboembolism in men treated with it for prostate cancer. Ethinylestradiol has a to some degree lower risk of cardiovascular complications than does diethylstilbestrol when used in the treatment of prostate cancer in men. However, both ethinylestradiol and diethylstilbestrol nonetheless have highly disproportionate effects on liver protein synthesis, which is thought to be responsible for their cardiovascular toxicity.

In contrast to oral synthetic estrogens like ethinylestradiol and diethylstilbestrol, high-dosage polyestradiol phosphate and transdermal estradiol have not been found to increase the risk of cardiovascular mortality or thromboembolism in men with prostate cancer. However, significantly increased cardiovascular morbidity has been observed with high-dosage polyestradiol phosphate. In any case, these estrogens are considered to be much safer than oral synthetic estrogens like ethinylestradiol and diethylstilbestrol. In addition, ethinylestradiol sulfonate (EES), an oral but parenteral-like long-lasting prodrug of ethinylestradiol, is used in the treatment of prostate cancer, and is said to have a considerably better profile of cardiovascular safety than ethinylestradiol.

Because of its disproportionate effects on liver protein synthesis and associated cardiovascular risks, synthetic estrogens like ethinylestradiol and diethylstilbestrol are no longer used in menopausal hormone therapy. They are also being replaced by parenteral forms of estradiol like polyestradiol phosphate and transdermal estradiol in the treatment of prostate cancer.

==== Liver damage ====
At the lower dosages that are now used in birth control pills, ethinylestradiol has been associated rarely with cholestatic hepatotoxicity similarly to 17α-alkylated androgens/anabolic steroids and 17α-ethynylated 19-nortestosterone progestins. Cholestasis can manifest as pruritus and jaundice. Glucuronide metabolites of ethinylestradiol, via effects on the ABCB11 (BSEP) and MRP2 (ABCC2) proteins and consequent changes in bile flow and bile salt excretion, appear to be responsible for the cholestasis. Very high concentrations of estradiol, via its metabolite estradiol glucuronide, are also implicated in cholestasis, for instance in cholestasis of pregnancy. However, the incidence and severity of cholestatic hepatotoxicity appear to be much greater with ethinylestradiol than with estradiol, which is thought to be due to the reactive C17α ethynyl substitution in ethinylestradiol as well as its greatly reduced susceptibility to hepatic metabolism. Whereas abnormal liver function tests (LFTs) are normally found in about 1% of women not on birth control pills or taking lower-dose ethinylestradiol-containing birth control pills, this increases to more than 10% of women taking birth control pills containing 50 μg/day ethinylestradiol or more. With birth control pills containing 50 μg/day ethinylestradiol, alanine aminotransferase (ALT) levels increase by 50%, hematocrit by 19%, and leukocytes by 50%, while gamma-glutamyltransferase (GGT) decreases by 30%. However, the values usually remain in the normal range. In addition to abnormal LFTs, pathological changes in partial liver functions and liver morphology can be observed in half of women on birth control pills with 50 μg/day ethinylestradiol. Ethinylestradiol-containing birth control pills have also been associated with a 25- to 50-fold increase in the risk of rare benign liver tumors and a 3- to 6-fold increase in the risk of hepatocellular carcinoma, as well as greater risk of other liver complications. At one time, ethinylestradiol-containing birth control pills were estimated to be responsible for 84% of all drug-related and histologically verified liver damage. However, these risks now are reduced with modern lower-dose ethinylestradiol-containing birth control pills, with contain 35 μg/day ethinylestradiol or less.

==== Uterine cancer ====
The high doses of ethinylestradiol that were used in early combined oral contraceptives were associated with a significantly increased risk of endometrial cancer in certain preparations, for instance those containing the progestogen dimethisterone. Unopposed estrogens like ethinylestradiol have carcinogenic effects in the endometrium and progestogens protect against these effects, but dimethisterone is a relatively weak progestogen and was unable to adequately antagonize the endometrial carcinogenic effects of ethinylestradiol, in turn resulting in the increased risk of endometrial cancer. Combined oral contraceptives containing dimethisterone have been discontinued (with more potent progestogens used instead) and doses of ethinylestradiol in combined oral contraceptives in general have been dramatically reduced, abrogating the risk. In turn, most studies of combined oral contraceptives have found a decreased risk of endometrial cancer.

=== Ecological Effects ===
Wastewater contains various estrogens, including ethinylestradiol, that are not completely broken down by wastewater treatment procedures. The input of artificial estrogens into freshwater ecosystems affects fish and amphibian populations. Chronic exposure to low levels of ethinylestradiol over seven years led to the collapse of fathead minnow populations in an experimental lake in Ontario, Canada. Ethinylestradiol changed oogenesis in female fish and feminized male fish such that they produced a protein associated with egg maturation, vitellogenin, as well as early-stage eggs. In amphibians, exposure to ethinylestradiol can reduce hatching success and alter gonadal development. Exposure to hormones can change frogs' gonadal development even though it is encoded in their genes. A study of mink frogs found more intersex tadpoles in those experimentally exposed to ethinylestradiol than those not exposed to ethinylestradiol, and green frogs showed much lower rates of hatching success.

== Overdose ==
Estrogens like ethinylestradiol are relatively safe in acute overdose.

== Interactions ==
Ethinylestradiol is metabolized by certain cytochrome P450 isoforms, including CYP3A4 and CYP2C9. Thus, inducers of enzymes such as CYP3A4 can decrease circulating concentrations of ethinylestradiol. Examples of inducers include anticonvulsants like phenytoin, primidone, ethosuximide, phenobarbital, and carbamazepine; azole antifungals like fluconazole; and rifamycin antibiotics like rifampin (rifampicin). Conversely, inhibitors of CYP3A4 and other cytochrome P450 enzymes may increase circulating levels of ethinylestradiol. An example is troleandomycin, which is a potent and highly selective inhibitor of CYP3A4.

Paracetamol (acetaminophen) has been found to competitively inhibit the sulfation of ethinylestradiol, with pretreatment of 1,000 mg of paracetamol significantly increasing the AUC levels of ethinylestradiol (by 22%) and decreasing the AUC levels of ethinylestradiol sulfate (EE sulfate) in women. The same has been found for ascorbic acid (vitamin C) and ethinylestradiol, although the significance of the interaction has been regarded as dubious.

In contrast to estradiol, it is unlikely that there is a pharmacokinetic interaction between smoking (which potently induces certain cytochrome P450 enzymes and markedly increases the 2-hydroxylation of estradiol) and ethinylestradiol. This suggests that estradiol and ethinylestradiol are metabolized by different cytochrome P450 enzymes. There is, however, an increased risk of cardiovascular complications with smoking and ethinylestradiol, similarly to the case of smoking and other estrogens.

Ethinylestradiol is known to inhibit several cytochrome P450 enzymes, including CYP1A2, CYP2B6, CYP2C9, CYP2C19, and CYP3A4, and is possibly an inducer of CYP2A6. As a result, it can affect the metabolism and concentrations of many other drugs. Examples of known interactions include bupropion, caffeine, mephenytoin, midazolam, nicotine, nifedipine, omeprazole, propranolol, proguanil, selegiline, theophylline, and tizanidine. One of the most notable interactions is that ethinylestradiol strongly increases levels of selegiline, a substrate of CYP2B6 and CYP2C19. Ethinylestradiol may also induce glucuronidation and possibly alter sulfation. It has been found to increase the clearance of and reduce the concentrations of a variety of drugs known to be glucuronidated. Examples include clofibrate, lamotrigine, lorazepam, oxazepam, and propranolol.

Progestins, which are often used in combination with ethinylestradiol, are also known to inhibit cytochrome P450 enzymes, and this may contribute to drug interactions with ethinylestradiol-containing contraceptives as well. Examples include gestodene, desogestrel, and etonogestrel, which are CYP3A4 and CYP2C19 inhibitors. In addition, these progestins are known to progressively inhibit the metabolism of and increase concentrations of ethinylestradiol itself.

== Pharmacology ==
=== Pharmacodynamics ===
Ethinylestradiol is an estrogen similarly to natural estrogens like estradiol and conjugated estrogens (Premarin) and synthetic estrogens like diethylstilbestrol. It binds to and activates both isoforms of the estrogen receptor, ERα and ERβ. In one study, ethinylestradiol was found to have 233% and 38% of the affinity of estradiol for the ERα and ERβ, respectively. In another study, it was found to possess 194% and 151% of the affinity of estradiol for the ERα and ERβ, respectively. Ethinylestradiol also appears to act as a potent agonist of the G protein-coupled estrogen receptor (GPER) (affinity unknown), a membrane estrogen receptor, similarly to estradiol. Estrogens have antigonadotropic effects through activation of the ERα. As a contraceptive, ethinylestradiol acts in concert with a progestin to inhibit the mid-cycle surge in luteinizing hormone (LH) and follicle-stimulating hormone (FSH) via its antigonadotropic effects, thereby inhibiting folliculogenesis and preventing ovulation and hence the possibility of pregnancy.

Ethinylestradiol is a long-acting estrogen, with a nuclear retention of about 24 hours.

Orally, ethinylestradiol is on the order of 100 times as potent by weight as natural estrogens like micronized estradiol and conjugated estrogens, which is largely due to substantially greater resistance to first-pass metabolism. It is specifically in the range of 80 to 200 times as potent as estropipate (piperazine estrone sulfate), which has similar potency to micronized estradiol, in terms of systemic estrogenic potency. In contrast, the potencies of ethinylestradiol and natural estrogens are similar when they are administered intravenously, due to the bypassing of first-pass metabolism. Relative to its prodrug mestranol, ethinylestradiol is about 1.7 times as potent by weight orally.

Affinities of estrogen receptor ligands for the ERα and ERβ
Ligand	Other names	Relative binding affinities (RBA, %)^{a}		Absolute binding affinities (K_{i}, nM)^{a}		Action
Ligand	Other names	ERα	ERβ	ERα	ERβ	Action
Estradiol	E2; 17β-Estradiol	100	100	0.115 (0.04–0.24)	0.15 (0.10–2.08)	Estrogen
Estrone	E1; 17-Ketoestradiol	16.39 (0.7–60)	6.5 (1.36–52)	0.445 (0.3–1.01)	1.75 (0.35–9.24)	Estrogen
Estriol	E3; 16α-OH-17β-E2	12.65 (4.03–56)	26 (14.0–44.6)	0.45 (0.35–1.4)	0.7 (0.63–0.7)	Estrogen
Estetrol	E4; 15α,16α-Di-OH-17β-E2	4.0	3.0	4.9	19	Estrogen
Alfatradiol	17α-Estradiol	20.5 (7–80.1)	8.195 (2–42)	0.2–0.52	0.43–1.2	Metabolite
16-Epiestriol	16β-Hydroxy-17β-estradiol	7.795 (4.94–63)	50	?	?	Metabolite
17-Epiestriol	16α-Hydroxy-17α-estradiol	55.45 (29–103)	79–80	?	?	Metabolite
16,17-Epiestriol	16β-Hydroxy-17α-estradiol	1.0	13	?	?	Metabolite
2-Hydroxyestradiol	2-OH-E2	22 (7–81)	11–35	2.5	1.3	Metabolite
2-Methoxyestradiol	2-MeO-E2	0.0027–2.0	1.0	?	?	Metabolite
4-Hydroxyestradiol	4-OH-E2	13 (8–70)	7–56	1.0	1.9	Metabolite
4-Methoxyestradiol	4-MeO-E2	2.0	1.0	?	?	Metabolite
2-Hydroxyestrone	2-OH-E1	2.0–4.0	0.2–0.4	?	?	Metabolite
2-Methoxyestrone	2-MeO-E1	<0.001–<1	<1	?	?	Metabolite
4-Hydroxyestrone	4-OH-E1	1.0–2.0	1.0	?	?	Metabolite
4-Methoxyestrone	4-MeO-E1	<1	<1	?	?	Metabolite
16α-Hydroxyestrone	16α-OH-E1; 17-Ketoestriol	2.0–6.5	35	?	?	Metabolite
2-Hydroxyestriol	2-OH-E3	2.0	1.0	?	?	Metabolite
4-Methoxyestriol	4-MeO-E3	1.0	1.0	?	?	Metabolite
Estradiol sulfate	E2S; Estradiol 3-sulfate	<1	<1	?	?	Metabolite
Estradiol disulfate	Estradiol 3,17β-disulfate	0.0004	?	?	?	Metabolite
Estradiol 3-glucuronide	E2-3G	0.0079	?	?	?	Metabolite
Estradiol 17β-glucuronide	E2-17G	0.0015	?	?	?	Metabolite
Estradiol 3-gluc. 17β-sulfate	E2-3G-17S	0.0001	?	?	?	Metabolite
Estrone sulfate	E1S; Estrone 3-sulfate	<1	<1	>10	>10	Metabolite
Estradiol benzoate	EB; Estradiol 3-benzoate	10	?	?	?	Estrogen
Estradiol 17β-benzoate	E2-17B	11.3	32.6	?	?	Estrogen
Estrone methyl ether	Estrone 3-methyl ether	0.145	?	?	?	Estrogen
ent-Estradiol	1-Estradiol	1.31–12.34	9.44–80.07	?	?	Estrogen
Equilin	7-Dehydroestrone	13 (4.0–28.9)	13.0–49	0.79	0.36	Estrogen
Equilenin	6,8-Didehydroestrone	2.0–15	7.0–20	0.64	0.62	Estrogen
17β-Dihydroequilin	7-Dehydro-17β-estradiol	7.9–113	7.9–108	0.09	0.17	Estrogen
17α-Dihydroequilin	7-Dehydro-17α-estradiol	18.6 (18–41)	14–32	0.24	0.57	Estrogen
17β-Dihydroequilenin	6,8-Didehydro-17β-estradiol	35–68	90–100	0.15	0.20	Estrogen
17α-Dihydroequilenin	6,8-Didehydro-17α-estradiol	20	49	0.50	0.37	Estrogen
Δ^{8}-Estradiol	8,9-Dehydro-17β-estradiol	68	72	0.15	0.25	Estrogen
Δ^{8}-Estrone	8,9-Dehydroestrone	19	32	0.52	0.57	Estrogen
Ethinylestradiol	EE; 17α-Ethynyl-17β-E2	120.9 (68.8–480)	44.4 (2.0–144)	0.02–0.05	0.29–0.81	Estrogen
Mestranol	EE 3-methyl ether	?	2.5	?	?	Estrogen
Moxestrol	RU-2858; 11β-Methoxy-EE	35–43	5–20	0.5	2.6	Estrogen
Methylestradiol	17α-Methyl-17β-estradiol	70	44	?	?	Estrogen
Diethylstilbestrol	DES; Stilbestrol	129.5 (89.1–468)	219.63 (61.2–295)	0.04	0.05	Estrogen
Hexestrol	Dihydrodiethylstilbestrol	153.6 (31–302)	60–234	0.06	0.06	Estrogen
Dienestrol	Dehydrostilbestrol	37 (20.4–223)	56–404	0.05	0.03	Estrogen
Benzestrol (B2)	–	114	?	?	?	Estrogen
Chlorotrianisene	TACE	1.74	?	15.30	?	Estrogen
Triphenylethylene	TPE	0.074	?	?	?	Estrogen
Triphenylbromoethylene	TPBE	2.69	?	?	?	Estrogen
Tamoxifen	ICI-46,474	3 (0.1–47)	3.33 (0.28–6)	3.4–9.69	2.5	SERM
Afimoxifene	4-Hydroxytamoxifen; 4-OHT	100.1 (1.7–257)	10 (0.98–339)	2.3 (0.1–3.61)	0.04–4.8	SERM
Toremifene	4-Chlorotamoxifen; 4-CT	?	?	7.14–20.3	15.4	SERM
Clomifene	MRL-41	25 (19.2–37.2)	12	0.9	1.2	SERM
Cyclofenil	F-6066; Sexovid	151–152	243	?	?	SERM
Nafoxidine	U-11,000A	30.9–44	16	0.3	0.8	SERM
Raloxifene	–	41.2 (7.8–69)	5.34 (0.54–16)	0.188–0.52	20.2	SERM
Arzoxifene	LY-353,381	?	?	0.179	?	SERM
Lasofoxifene	CP-336,156	10.2–166	19.0	0.229	?	SERM
Ormeloxifene	Centchroman	?	?	0.313	?	SERM
Levormeloxifene	6720-CDRI; NNC-460,020	1.55	1.88	?	?	SERM
Ospemifene	Deaminohydroxytoremifene	0.82–2.63	0.59–1.22	?	?	SERM
Bazedoxifene	–	?	?	0.053	?	SERM
Etacstil	GW-5638	4.30	11.5	?	?	SERM
ICI-164,384	–	63.5 (3.70–97.7)	166	0.2	0.08	Antiestrogen
Fulvestrant	ICI-182,780	43.5 (9.4–325)	21.65 (2.05–40.5)	0.42	1.3	Antiestrogen
Propylpyrazoletriol	PPT	49 (10.0–89.1)	0.12	0.40	92.8	ERα agonist
16α-LE2	16α-Lactone-17β-estradiol	14.6–57	0.089	0.27	131	ERα agonist
16α-Iodo-E2	16α-Iodo-17β-estradiol	30.2	2.30	?	?	ERα agonist
Methylpiperidinopyrazole	MPP	11	0.05	?	?	ERα antagonist
Diarylpropionitrile	DPN	0.12–0.25	6.6–18	32.4	1.7	ERβ agonist
8β-VE2	8β-Vinyl-17β-estradiol	0.35	22.0–83	12.9	0.50	ERβ agonist
Prinaberel	ERB-041; WAY-202,041	0.27	67–72	?	?	ERβ agonist
ERB-196	WAY-202,196	?	180	?	?	ERβ agonist
Erteberel	SERBA-1; LY-500,307	?	?	2.68	0.19	ERβ agonist
SERBA-2	–	?	?	14.5	1.54	ERβ agonist
Coumestrol	–	9.225 (0.0117–94)	64.125 (0.41–185)	0.14–80.0	0.07–27.0	Xenoestrogen
Genistein	–	0.445 (0.0012–16)	33.42 (0.86–87)	2.6–126	0.3–12.8	Xenoestrogen
Equol	–	0.2–0.287	0.85 (0.10–2.85)	?	?	Xenoestrogen
Daidzein	–	0.07 (0.0018–9.3)	0.7865 (0.04–17.1)	2.0	85.3	Xenoestrogen
Biochanin A	–	0.04 (0.022–0.15)	0.6225 (0.010–1.2)	174	8.9	Xenoestrogen
Kaempferol	–	0.07 (0.029–0.10)	2.2 (0.002–3.00)	?	?	Xenoestrogen
Naringenin	–	0.0054 (<0.001–0.01)	0.15 (0.11–0.33)	?	?	Xenoestrogen
8-Prenylnaringenin	8-PN	4.4	?	?	?	Xenoestrogen
Quercetin	–	<0.001–0.01	0.002–0.040	?	?	Xenoestrogen
Ipriflavone	–	<0.01	<0.01	?	?	Xenoestrogen
Miroestrol	–	0.39	?	?	?	Xenoestrogen
Deoxymiroestrol	–	2.0	?	?	?	Xenoestrogen
β-Sitosterol	–	<0.001–0.0875	<0.001–0.016	?	?	Xenoestrogen
Resveratrol	–	<0.001–0.0032	?	?	?	Xenoestrogen
α-Zearalenol	–	48 (13–52.5)	?	?	?	Xenoestrogen
β-Zearalenol	–	0.6 (0.032–13)	?	?	?	Xenoestrogen
Zeranol	α-Zearalanol	48–111	?	?	?	Xenoestrogen
Taleranol	β-Zearalanol	16 (13–17.8)	14	0.8	0.9	Xenoestrogen
Zearalenone	ZEN	7.68 (2.04–28)	9.45 (2.43–31.5)	?	?	Xenoestrogen
Zearalanone	ZAN	0.51	?	?	?	Xenoestrogen
Bisphenol A	BPA	0.0315 (0.008–1.0)	0.135 (0.002–4.23)	195	35	Xenoestrogen
Endosulfan	EDS	<0.001–<0.01	<0.01	?	?	Xenoestrogen
Kepone	Chlordecone	0.0069–0.2	?	?	?	Xenoestrogen
o,p'-DDT	–	0.0073–0.4	?	?	?	Xenoestrogen
p,p'-DDT	–	0.03	?	?	?	Xenoestrogen
Methoxychlor	p,p'-Dimethoxy-DDT	0.01 (<0.001–0.02)	0.01–0.13	?	?	Xenoestrogen
HPTE	Hydroxychlor; p,p'-OH-DDT	1.2–1.7	?	?	?	Xenoestrogen
Testosterone	T; 4-Androstenolone	<0.0001–<0.01	<0.002–0.040	>5000	>5000	Androgen
Dihydrotestosterone	DHT; 5α-Androstanolone	0.01 (<0.001–0.05)	0.0059–0.17	221–>5000	73–1688	Androgen
Nandrolone	19-Nortestosterone; 19-NT	0.01	0.23	765	53	Androgen
Dehydroepiandrosterone	DHEA; Prasterone	0.038 (<0.001–0.04)	0.019–0.07	245–1053	163–515	Androgen
5-Androstenediol	A5; Androstenediol	6	17	3.6	0.9	Androgen
4-Androstenediol	–	0.5	0.6	23	19	Androgen
4-Androstenedione	A4; Androstenedione	<0.01	<0.01	>10000	>10000	Androgen
3α-Androstanediol	3α-Adiol	0.07	0.3	260	48	Androgen
3β-Androstanediol	3β-Adiol	3	7	6	2	Androgen
Androstanedione	5α-Androstanedione	<0.01	<0.01	>10000	>10000	Androgen
Etiocholanedione	5β-Androstanedione	<0.01	<0.01	>10000	>10000	Androgen
Methyltestosterone	17α-Methyltestosterone	<0.0001	?	?	?	Androgen
Ethinyl-3α-androstanediol	17α-Ethynyl-3α-adiol	4.0	<0.07	?	?	Estrogen
Ethinyl-3β-androstanediol	17α-Ethynyl-3β-adiol	50	5.6	?	?	Estrogen
Progesterone	P4; 4-Pregnenedione	<0.001–0.6	<0.001–0.010	?	?	Progestogen
Norethisterone	NET; 17α-Ethynyl-19-NT	0.085 (0.0015–<0.1)	0.1 (0.01–0.3)	152	1084	Progestogen
Norethynodrel	5(10)-Norethisterone	0.5 (0.3–0.7)	<0.1–0.22	14	53	Progestogen
Tibolone	7α-Methylnorethynodrel	0.5 (0.45–2.0)	0.2–0.076	?	?	Progestogen
Δ^{4}-Tibolone	7α-Methylnorethisterone	0.069–<0.1	0.027–<0.1	?	?	Progestogen
3α-Hydroxytibolone	–	2.5 (1.06–5.0)	0.6–0.8	?	?	Progestogen
3β-Hydroxytibolone	–	1.6 (0.75–1.9)	0.070–0.1	?	?	Progestogen
Footnotes: ^{a} = (1) Binding affinity values are of the format "median (range)" (# (#–#)), "range" (#–#), or "value" (#) depending on the values available. The full sets of values within the ranges can be found in the Wiki code. (2) Binding affinities were determined via displacement studies in a variety of in-vitro systems with labeled estradiol and human ERα and ERβ proteins (except the ERβ values from Kuiper et al. (1997), which are rat ERβ). Sources: See template page.

Relative affinities of estrogens for steroid hormone receptors and blood proteins
Estrogen	Relative binding affinities (%)						
Estrogen	ER	AR	PR	GR	MR	SHBG	CBG
Estradiol	100	7.9	2.6	0.6	0.13	8.7–12	<0.1
Estradiol benzoate	?	?	?	?	?	<0.1–0.16	<0.1
Estradiol valerate	2	?	?	?	?	?	?
Estrone	11–35	<1	<1	<1	<1	2.7	<0.1
Estrone sulfate	2	2	?	?	?	?	?
Estriol	10–15	<1	<1	<1	<1	<0.1	<0.1
Equilin	40	?	?	?	?	?	0
Alfatradiol	15	<1	<1	<1	<1	?	?
Epiestriol	20	<1	<1	<1	<1	?	?
Ethinylestradiol	100–112	1–3	15–25	1–3	<1	0.18	<0.1
Mestranol	1	?	?	?	?	<0.1	<0.1
Methylestradiol	67	1–3	3–25	1–3	<1	?	?
Moxestrol	12	<0.1	0.8	3.2	<0.1	<0.2	<0.1
Diethylstilbestrol	?	?	?	?	?	<0.1	<0.1
Notes: Reference ligands (100%) were progesterone for the PR, testosterone for the AR, estradiol for the ER, dexamethasone for the GR, aldosterone for the MR, dihydrotestosterone for SHBG, and cortisol for CBG. Sources: See template.

Relative oral potencies of estrogens
Estrogen	HF	VE	UCa	FSH	LH	HDL-C	SHBG	CBG	AGT	Liver
Estradiol	1.0	1.0	1.0	1.0	1.0	1.0	1.0	1.0	1.0	1.0
Estrone	?	?	?	0.3	0.3	?	?	?	?	?
Estriol	0.3	0.3	0.1	0.3	0.3	0.2	?	?	?	0.67
Estrone sulfate	?	0.9	0.9	0.8–0.9	0.9	0.5	0.9	0.5–0.7	1.4–1.5	0.56–1.7
Conjugated estrogens	1.2	1.5	2.0	1.1–1.3	1.0	1.5	3.0–3.2	1.3–1.5	5.0	1.3–4.5
Equilin sulfate	?	?	1.0	?	?	6.0	7.5	6.0	7.5	?
Ethinylestradiol	120	150	400	60–150	100	400	500–600	500–600	350	2.9–5.0
Diethylstilbestrol	?	?	?	2.9–3.4	?	?	26–28	25–37	20	5.7–7.5
Sources and footnotes Notes: Values are ratios, with estradiol as standard (i.e., 1.0). Abbreviations: HF = Clinical relief of hot flashes. VE = Increased proliferation of vaginal epithelium. UCa = Decrease in UCa. FSH = Suppression of FSH levels. LH = Suppression of LH levels. HDL-C, SHBG, CBG, and AGT = Increase in the serum levels of these liver proteins. Liver = Ratio of liver estrogenic effects to general/systemic estrogenic effects (hot flashes/gonadotropins). Sources: See template.

Potencies of oral estrogens
Compound	Dosage for specific uses (mg usually) (Note: Dosages are given in milligrams unless otherwise noted.)					
Compound	ETD (Note: Dosed every 2 to 3 weeks)	EPD	MSD	MSD (Note: Dosed daily)	OID	TSD
Estradiol (non-micronized)	30	≥120–300	120	6	-	-
Estradiol (micronized)	6–12	60–80	14–42	1–2	>5	>8
Estradiol valerate	6–12	60–80	14–42	1–2	-	>8
Estradiol benzoate	-	60–140	-	-	-	-
Estriol	≥20	120–150 (Note: In divided doses, 3x/day; irregular and atypical proliferation.)	28–126	1–6	>5	-
Estriol succinate	-	140–150	28–126	2–6	-	-
Estrone sulfate	12	60	42	2	-	-
Conjugated estrogens	5–12	60–80	8.4–25	0.625–1.25	>3.75	7.5
Ethinylestradiol	200 μg	1–2	280 μg	20–40 μg	100 μg	100 μg
Mestranol	300 μg	1.5–3.0	300–600 μg	25–30 μg	>80 μg	-
Quinestrol	300 μg	2–4	500 μg	25–50 μg	-	-
Methylestradiol	-	2	-	-	-	-
Diethylstilbestrol	2.5	20–30	11	0.5–2.0	>5	3
DES dipropionate	-	15–30	-	-	-	-
Dienestrol	5	30–40	42	0.5–4.0	-	-
Dienestrol diacetate	3–5	30–60	-	-	-	-
Hexestrol	-	70–110	-	-	-	-
Chlorotrianisene	-	>100	-	-	>48	-
Methallenestril	-	400	-	-	-	-
Sources and footnotes:

==== Antiandrogenic and antigonadotropic effects ====
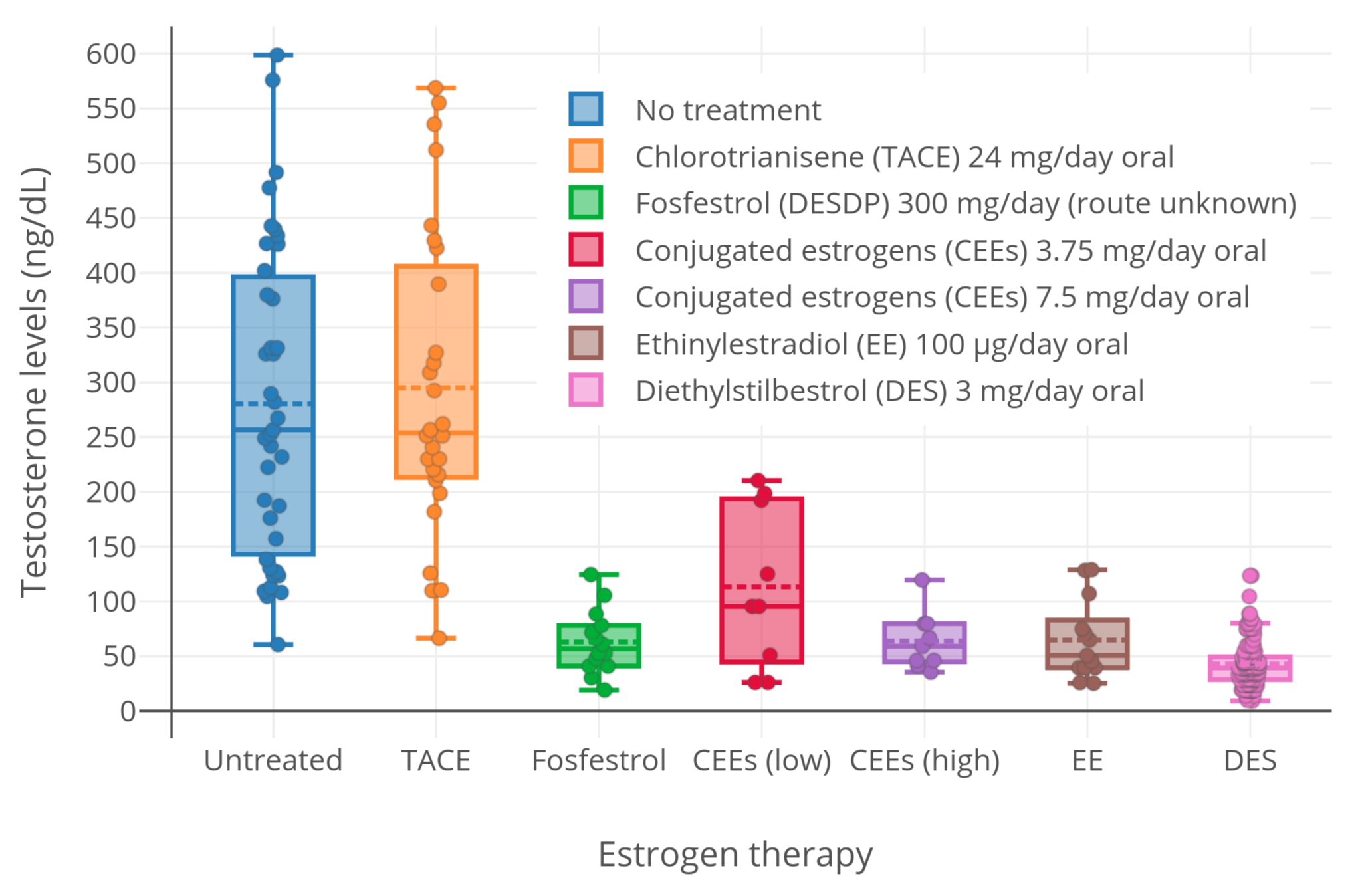
Testosterone levels with no treatment and with various estrogens in men with prostate cancer. Determinations were made with an early radioimmunoassay (RIA). Source was Shearer et al. (1973).

Ethinylestradiol is a potent functional antiandrogen in both women and men. It mediates its antiandrogenic effects by 1) stimulating the production of sex hormone-binding globulin (SHBG) in the liver, which decreases free and thus bioactive concentrations of testosterone in the blood; and by 2) suppressing luteinizing hormone (LH) secretion from the pituitary gland, which decreases production of testosterone by the gonads. Birth control pills that contain ethinylestradiol are useful in the treatment of androgen-dependent conditions like acne and hirsutism by virtue of their antiandrogenic effects.

Birth control pills containing ethinylestradiol have been found in women to reduce total testosterone levels by 30% on average, to increase circulating SHBG levels by about 3-fold on average (but variable depending on progestin, range 1.5- to 5-fold increase), and to reduce free testosterone concentrations by 60% on average (range 40 to 80%). Birth control pills containing high doses of ethinylestradiol can increase SHBG levels in women by as much as 5- to 10-fold. This is similar to the 5- to 10-fold increase in SHBG levels that occurs during pregnancy. Due to the marked increase in SHBG levels, free testosterone levels become very low during treatment with ethinylestradiol-containing birth control pills. In men, a study found that treatment with a relatively low dosage of 20 μg/day ethinylestradiol for five weeks increased circulating SHBG levels by 150% and, due to the accompanying decrease in free testosterone levels, increased total circulating levels of testosterone by 50% (via upregulation of gonadal testosterone production due to reduced negative feedback by androgens on the hypothalamic–pituitary–gonadal axis). The stimulation of hepatic SHBG production by ethinylestradiol is far stronger than with other estrogens like estradiol, owing to the high resistance of ethinylestradiol to inactivation in the liver and hence its disproportionate effects in this part of the body.

Estrogens are antigonadotropins and are able to suppress the secretion of LH and FSH from the pituitary gland and by extension gonadal testosterone production. High-dose estrogen therapy, including with ethinylestradiol, is able to suppress testosterone levels in men by around 95%, or into the castrate/female range. The dosage of ethinylestradiol required for use as a component of hormone therapy for preoperative transgender women is 50 to 100 μg/day. This high dosage is associated with a high incidence of venous thromboembolism, particularly in those over the age of 40 years, and it has been said that it should not be used. The dosage of ethinylestradiol used in the treatment of prostate cancer in men is 150 to 1,000 μg/day (0.15–1.0 mg/day). A dosage of ethinylestradiol of 50 μg twice daily (100 μg/day total) has been found to suppress testosterone levels in men to an equivalent extent as 3 mg/day oral diethylstilbestrol, which is the minimum dosage of diethylstilbestrol required to consistently suppress testosterone levels into the castrate range. The ovulation-inhibiting dose of ethinylestradiol by itself and not in combination with a progestin in women is 100 μg/day. However, it has been found to be about 75 to 90% effective at inhibiting ovulation at a dosage of 20 μg/day and about 97 or 98% effective at a dosage of 50 μg/day. In another study, ovulation occurred in 25.2% with an ethinylestradiol dose of 50 μg/day.

Lower dosages of ethinylestradiol also have significant antigonadotropic effects. A "very low" dosage of 15 μg/day ethinylestradiol has been described as the "borderline" amount required for suppression of LH and testosterone levels in men, and a study found that LH and testosterone levels were "reliably" suppressed in men by a dosage of 30 μg/day ethinylestradiol. However, other clinical studies have found that 20 μg/day ethinylestradiol increased testosterone levels by 50% in men (as described above) and that dosages of 32 μg/day and 42 μg/day ethinylestradiol suppressed FSH levels in men but did not significantly affect LH levels. A stronger suppression of testosterone levels was observed in men following daily treatment with a combined oral contraceptive containing 50 μg ethinylestradiol and 0.5 mg norgestrel for 9 days. However, investigation revealed that the progestin was the more important component responsible for the suppression in testosterone levels. In accordance, the progestin component of combined oral contraceptives is primarily responsible for inhibition of ovulation in women. A combination of 20 μg/day ethinylestradiol and 10 mg/day methyltestosterone was found to suppress FSH secretion in men to an extent sufficient to stop spermatogenesis. Studies in women have found that 50 μg/day ethinylestradiol suppresses LH and FSH levels both by about 70% in postmenopausal women.

In addition to its antigonadotropic effects, ethinylestradiol can significantly suppress androgen production by the adrenal glands at high concentrations. One study found that treatment with a high dosage of 100 μg/day ethinylestradiol suppressed circulating adrenal androgen levels by 27 to 48% in transgender women. This may additionally contribute to suppression of androgen levels by estrogens.

==== Effects on liver protein synthesis ====
Ethinylestradiol has marked effects on liver protein synthesis, even at low dosages and regardless of route of administration. These effects are mediated by its estrogenic activity. The medication dose-dependently increases circulating levels of SHBG, corticosteroid-binding globulin (CBG), and thyroxine-binding globulin (TBG), and also affects a broad range of other liver proteins. Ethinylestradiol affects triglyceride levels at a dose as low as 1 μg/day and LDL and HDL cholesterol levels at a dose as low as 2.5 μg/day. Ethinylestradiol affects several liver proteins at a dosage as low as 5 μg/day. At doses above 20 μg/day, the incremental effects of ethinylestradiol on liver protein synthesis become continuously smaller.

Ethinylestradiol at 5 μg/day has been found to increase SHBG levels by 100% in postmenopausal women, while a dosage of 20 μg/day ethinylestradiol increased them by 200%. Androgens decrease hepatic SHBG production, and have been found to oppose the effects of ethinylestradiol on SHBG levels. This is of particular relevance when it is considered that many progestins used in combined oral contraceptives have varying degrees of weak androgenic activity. A combination of 20 μg/day ethinylestradiol and 0.25 mg/day levonorgestrel, a progestin with relatively high androgenicity, decreases SHBG levels by 50%; 30 μg/day ethinylestradiol and 0.25 mg/day levonorgestrel has no effect on SHBG levels; 30 μg/day ethinylestradiol and 0.15 mg/day levonorgestrel increases SHBG levels by 30%; and triphasic combined oral contraceptives containing ethinylestradiol and levonorgestrel increase SHBG levels by 100 to 150%. The combination of 30 μg/day ethinylestradiol and 150 μg/day desogestrel, a progestin with relatively weak androgenicity than levonorgestrel, increases SHBG levels by 200%, while the combination of 35 μg/day ethinylestradiol and 2 mg/day cyproterone acetate, a progestin with potent antiandrogenic activity, increases SHBG levels by 400%. As such, the type and dosage of progestin contained in combined oral contraceptives potently moderates the effects of ethinylestradiol on SHBG levels.

A dosage of 10 μg/day ethinylestradiol has been found to increase CBG levels by 50%, while a dosage of 20 μg/day ethinylestradiol increased them by 100%. Progestins that are progesterone derivatives have no effect on CBG levels, while androgenic progestins like the 19-nortestosterone derivatives have only a weak effect on CBG levels. Combined oral contraceptives may increase CBG levels by 100 to 150%. A dosage of 5 μg/day ethinylestradiol has been found to increase TBG levels by 40%, while a dosage of 20 μg/day ethinylestradiol increased them by 60%. Progestins that are progesterone derivatives do not affect TBG levels, while progestins with androgenic activity may decrease TBG levels. A combination of 30 μg/day ethinylestradiol and 1 mg/day norethisterone, a moderately androgenic progestin, have been found to increase TBG levels by 50 to 70%, while the combination of 30 μg/day ethinylestradiol and 150 μg/day desogestrel increased them by 100%.

==== Effects on pituitary hormone levels ====
Estrogens directly regulate the expression of the pituitary hormone oxytocin via an estrogen response element (ERE) present in the gene encoding for the hormone. Relatedly, they have been found to increase the secretion of oxytocin and also to increase the expression of its receptor, the oxytocin receptor, in the brain. In women, a single dose of ethinylestradiol has been found to be sufficient to increase circulating oxytocin concentrations. A single 1 mg oral dose of ethinylestradiol increased oxytocin levels by 1.9-fold, from about 2.4 pg/mL to about 4.4 pg/mL, in healthy women in one study. Levels began increasing by 12 hours post-dose, peaked between 18 and 36 hours post-dose, and began declining by 42 hours post-dose. In another study, a 100 μg dose of mestranol, a prodrug of ethinylestradiol, increased oxytocin levels by 1.7-fold, from about 2.0 pg/mL to 3.5 pg/mL, with levels increasing by 12 hours post-dose, plateauing between 12 and 36 hours post-dose, and declining starting by 48 hours post-dose. Other studies have also reported increases in oxytocin levels with ethinylestradiol or mestranol. Ethinylestradiol is being studied as a potential provocation test for diagnosis of oxytocin deficiency, for instance in people with arginine vasopressin deficiency (central diabetes insipidus).

==== Differences from estradiol ====
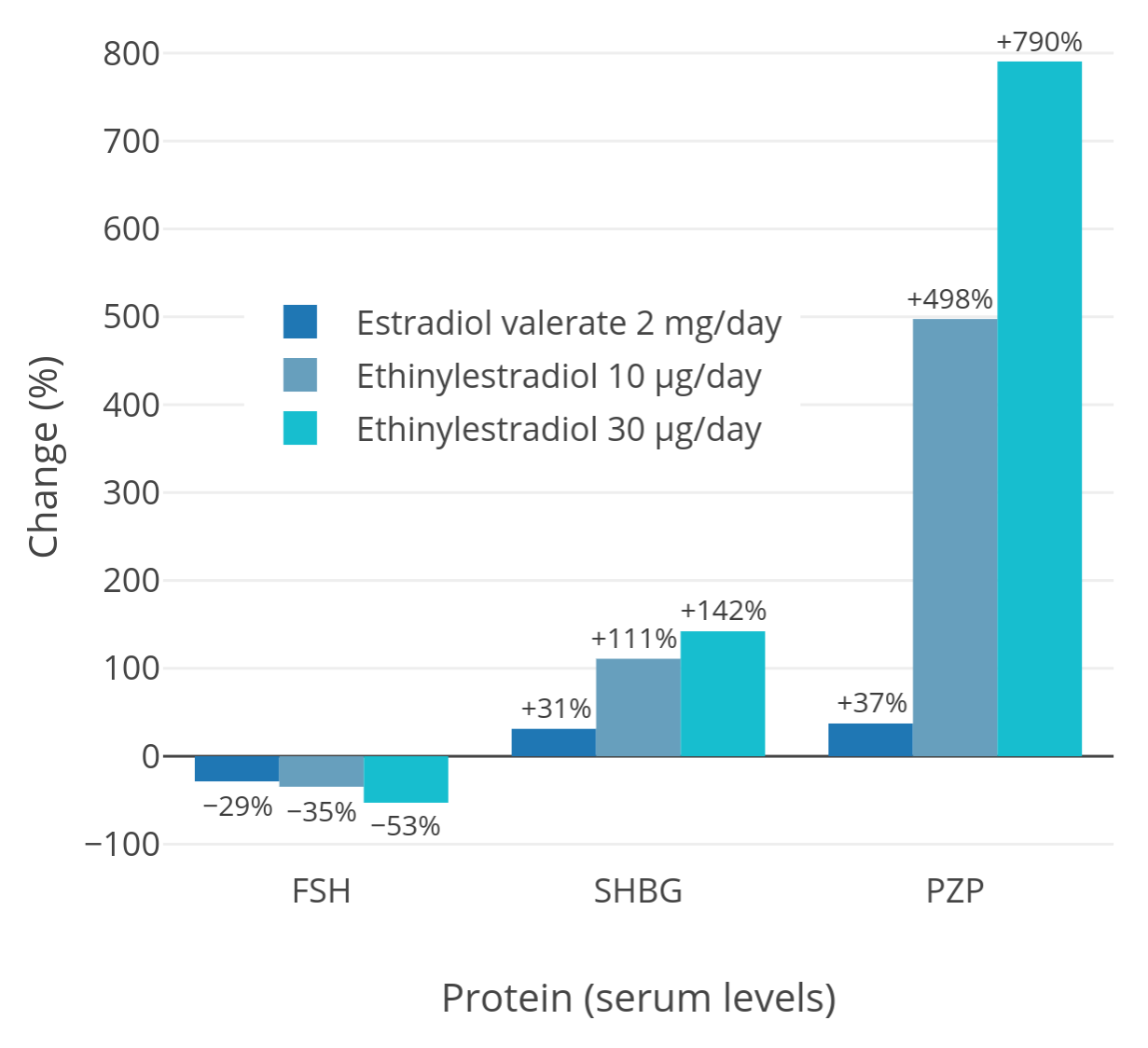
Changes in levels of estrogen-sensitive proteins after treatment with oral estradiol or oral ethinylestradiol in postmenopausal women. FSH is a pituitary protein and represents general/systemic estrogenic effect, while SHBG and PZP are hepatic proteins and represent liver estrogenic effect.

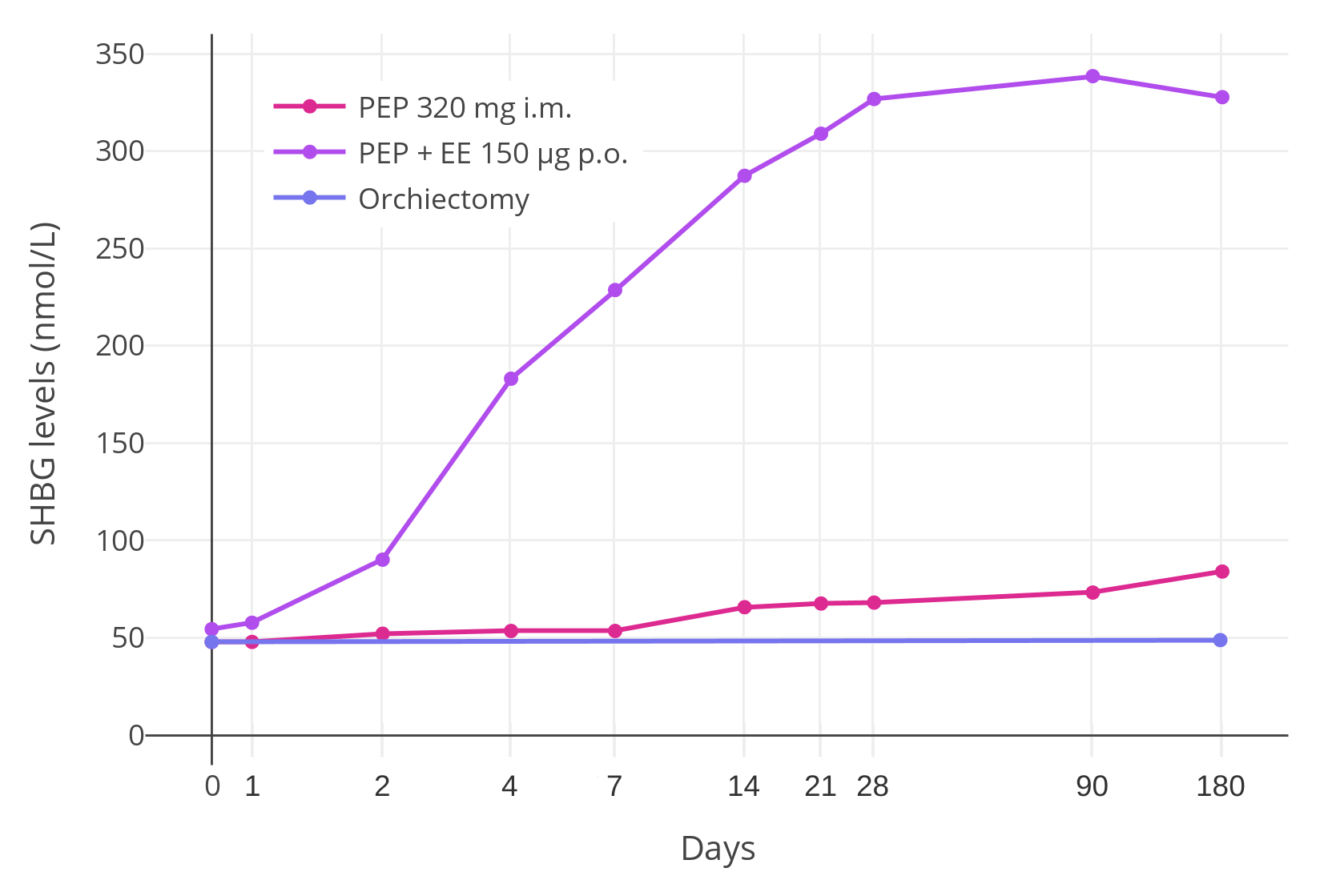
SHBG levels in men with 1) intramuscular injection of 320 mg polyestradiol phosphate once every 4 weeks alone; 2) the combination of intramuscular injection of 80 mg polyestradiol phosphate once every 4 weeks plus 150 μg/day oral ethinylestradiol; 3) orchiectomy only.

Ethinylestradiol shows strong and disproportionate effects on liver protein synthesis relative to estradiol. The liver as well as the uterus express 17β-hydroxysteroid dehydrogenase (17β-HSD), and this enzyme serves to inactivate estradiol and effectively suppress its potency in these tissues by reversibly converting it into the far less potent estrogen estrone (which has approximately 4% of the estrogenic activity of estradiol). In contrast to estradiol, the 17α-ethynyl group of ethinylestradiol prevents oxidation of the C17β position of ethinylestradiol by 17β-HSD, and for this reason, ethinylestradiol is not inactivated in these tissues and has much stronger relative estrogenic activity in them. This is the mechanism of the disproportionately strong effects of ethinylestradiol on hepatic protein production, which results in a greatly increased magnitude of effect on venous thromboembolism and cardiovascular risks relative to estradiol.

On the other hand, due to the loss of inactivation of ethinylestradiol by 17β-HSD in the endometrium (uterus), ethinylestradiol is relatively more active than estradiol in the endometrium and, for this reason, is associated with a significantly lower incidence of vaginal bleeding and spotting in comparison. This is particularly so in the case of combined estrogen and progestogen therapy (as in combined oral contraceptives or menopausal HRT), as progestogens induce the expression of 17β-HSD in the endometrium. The reduced vaginal bleeding and spotting with ethinylestradiol is one of the main reasons that it is used in combined oral contraceptives instead of estradiol, in spite of its potentially inferior safety profile (related to its adverse effects on hepatic protein synthesis and venous thromboembolism incidence).

Ethinylestradiol has been found to have disproportionate effects on liver protein synthesis and venous thromboembolism risk regardless of whether the route of administration is oral, transdermal, or vaginal, indicating that the use of parenteral routes over the oral route does not result in ethinylestradiol having proportional hepatic actions relative to non-hepatic actions. However, the potency of ethinylestradiol on liver protein synthesis is in any case reduced with parenteral administration. A dosage of 10 μg/day vaginal ethinylestradiol has been found to be equivalent to 50 μg oral ethinylestradiol in terms of effects on liver protein synthesis, such as stimulation of hepatic SHBG production. As such, parenteral ethinylestradiol, which bypasses the first pass through the liver that occurs with oral ethinylestradiol, has been found to have a 5-fold lower impact on liver protein synthesis by weight than oral ethinylestradiol. In contrast to ethinylestradiol as well as to oral estradiol, transdermal estradiol shows few or no effects on liver protein synthesis at typical menopausal dosages.

Comparison of estradiol and ethinylestradiol
Parameters	Estradiol	Ethinylestradiol
ER affinity	1 × 10^{10} M^{-1}	2–5 × 10^{11} M^{-1}
Nuclear retention	6–8 hours	24 hours
Elimination half-life	90 minutes	7 hours
Substrate for 17β-HSD?	Yes	No
Bound to SHBG?	Yes	No
Relative oral liver potency	1	~500–1,500
Relative oral pituitary potency	1	200

=== Pharmacokinetics ===
==== Absorption ====
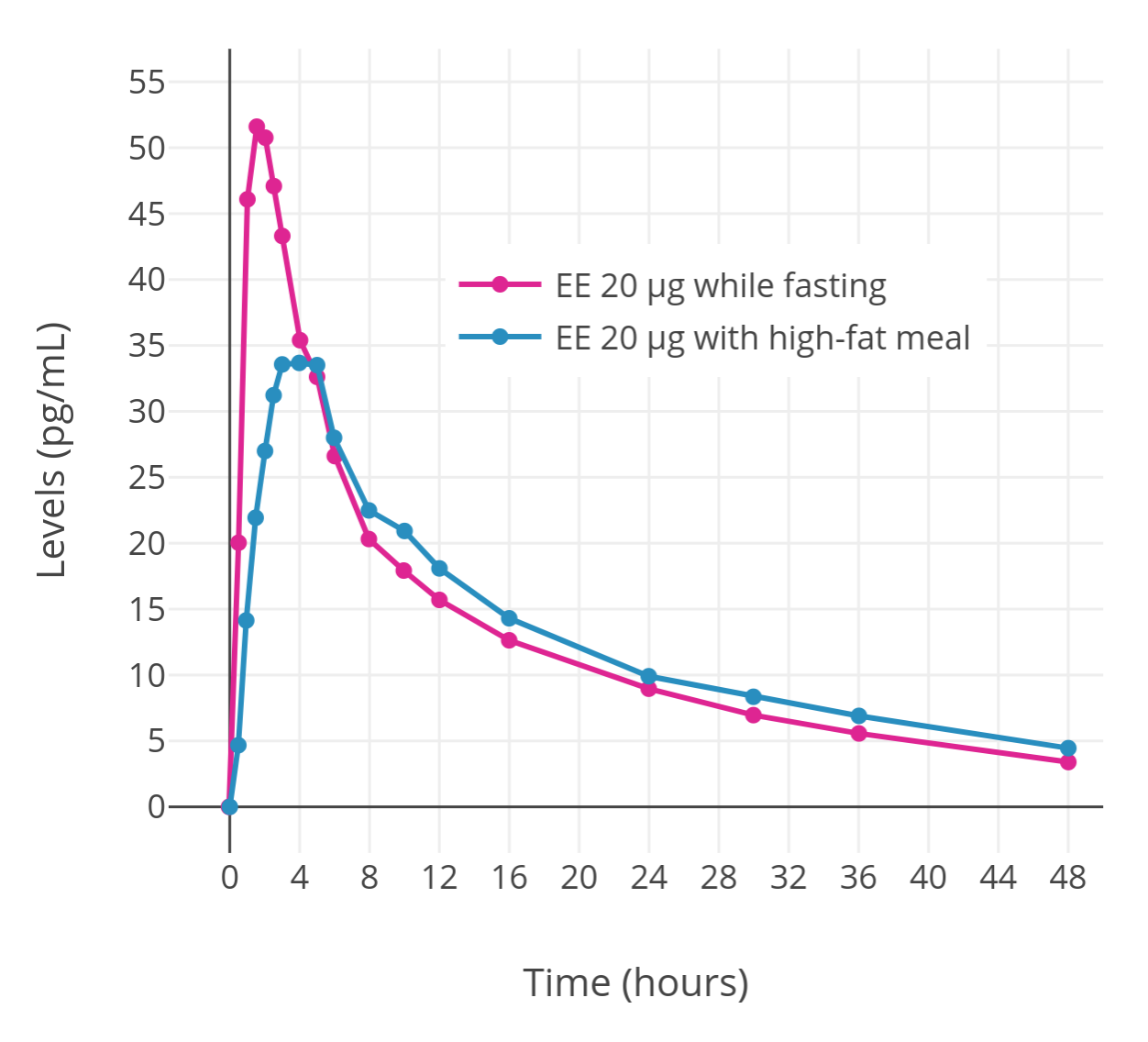
EE levels while fasting or with a high-fat meal following ingestion of tablets containing a single oral dose of 20 μg ethinylestradiol and 2 mg norethisterone acetate in women.

The oral bioavailability of ethinylestradiol is 45% on average, with a wide range of 20% to 74% (though most commonly between 38 and 48%) that is due to high interindividual variability. Although relatively low, the oral bioavailability of ethinylestradiol is considerably higher than that of micronized estradiol (5%). Following a single 20 μg dose of ethinylestradiol in combination with 2 mg norethisterone acetate in postmenopausal women, ethinylestradiol concentrations have been found to reach a maximum of 50 pg/mL within an average of 1.5 hours. Following the first dose, mean levels of ethinylestradiol in general further increase by about 50% until steady-state concentrations are reached; steady-state is reached after one week of daily administration. For comparison, the mean peak levels of estradiol achieved with 2 mg micronized estradiol or estradiol valerate are 40 pg/mL following the first dose and 80 pg/mL after three weeks of administration. These maximal concentrations of estradiol are in the same range as the concentrations of ethinylestradiol that are produced by an oral dose of ethinylestradiol that is 100 times lower by weight, which is in accordance with the approximately 100-fold increased oral potency of ethinylestradiol relative to estradiol. In accordance with the high interindividual variability in the oral bioavailability of ethinylestradiol, there is a large degree of interindividual variation in ethinylestradiol levels. A dosage of ethinylestradiol of 50 μg/day has been found to achieve a wide range of circulating ethinylestradiol levels of about 100 to 2,000 pg/mL. Taking ethinylestradiol in combination with a high-fat meal has been found to significantly decrease its peak concentrations.

Ethinylestradiol levels after a single 50 μg dose by intravenous injection are several times higher than levels of ethinylestradiol after a single 50 mg dose given orally. Besides the difference in levels, the course of elimination is similar for the two routes.

There may be gender-specific differences in the pharmacokinetics of ethinylestradiol, such that ethinylestradiol may have greater oral potency in women than in men. A study found that a combination of 60 μg/day ethinylestradiol and 0.25 mg/day levonorgestrel in women and men resulted in peak levels of ethinylestradiol of 495 pg/mL and 251 pg/mL, area-under-the-curve levels of ethinylestradiol of 6.216 pg/mL/hour and 2.850 pg/mL/hour, and elimination half-lives of 16.5 hours and 10.2 hours, respectively. It has been suggested that this phenomenon could represent a "protection mechanism" of males against environmental estrogen exposure.

==== Distribution ====
The plasma protein binding of ethinylestradiol is 97 to 98%, and it is bound almost exclusively to albumin. Unlike estradiol, which binds with high affinity to SHBG, ethinylestradiol has very low affinity for this protein, about 2% of that of estradiol, and hence does not bind to it importantly.

==== Metabolism ====
Due to high first-pass metabolism in the intestines and liver, only 1% of an oral dose of an ethinylestradiol appears in the circulation as ethinylestradiol itself. During first-pass metabolism, ethinylestradiol is extensively conjugated via glucuronidation and sulfation into the hormonally inert ethinylestradiol glucuronides and ethinylestradiol sulfate (EE sulfate), and levels of ethinylestradiol sulfate in circulation are between 6- and 22-fold higher than those of ethinylestradiol. For comparison, with oral administration of 2 mg micronized estradiol, levels of estrone and estrone sulfate are 4- to 6-fold and 200-fold higher than those of estradiol, respectively. In contrast to estradiol, ethinylestradiol, due to steric hindrance by its C17α ethynyl group, is not metabolized or inactivated by 17β-HSD, and this is the primary factor responsible for the dramatically increased potency of oral ethinylestradiol relative to oral estradiol. Ethinylestradiol is also not metabolized into estradiol.

Aside from sulfate conjugation, ethinylestradiol is mainly metabolized by hydroxylation into catechol estrogens. This is mainly by 2-hydroxylation into 2-hydroxy-EE, which is catalyzed primarily by CYP3A4. Hydroxylation of ethinylestradiol at the C4, C6α, and C16β positions into 4-, 6α-, and 16β-hydroxy-EE has also been reported, but appears to contribute to its metabolism to only a small extent. 2- and 4-methoxy-EE are also formed via transformation by catechol O-methyltransferase of 2- and 4-hydroxy-EE. Unlike the case of estradiol, 16α-hydroxylation does not occur with ethinylestradiol, owing to steric hindrance by its ethynyl group at C17α. The ethynylation of ethinylestradiol is largely irreversible, and so ethinylestradiol is not metabolized into estradiol, unlike estradiol esters. A review found that the range of the reported elimination half-life of ethinylestradiol in the literature was 13.1 to 27.0 hours. Another review reported an elimination half-life of ethinylestradiol of 10 to 20 hours. However, the elimination half-life of ethinylestradiol has also been reported by other sources to be as short as 7 hours and as long as 36 hours.

Unlike the case of estradiol, in which there is a rapid rise in its levels and which remain elevated in a plateau-like curve for many hours, levels of ethinylestradiol fall rapidly after peaking. This is thought to be because estrone and estrone sulfate can be reversibly converted back into estradiol and serve as a hormonally inert reservoir for estradiol, whereas the ethinylestradiol sulfate reservoir for ethinylestradiol is much smaller in comparison. In any case, due to the formation of ethinylestradiol sulfate, enterohepatic recirculation is involved in the pharmacokinetics of ethinylestradiol similarly to estradiol, although to a lesser extent. The contribution of enterohepatic recirculation to total circulating ethinylestradiol levels appears to be 12 to 20% or less, and is not observed consistently. A secondary peak in ethinylestradiol levels 10 to 14 hours after administration can often be observed with oral ethinylestradiol.

Ethinylestradiol, following oxidative formation of a very reactive metabolite, irreversibly inhibits cytochrome P450 enzymes involved in its metabolism, and this may also play a role in the increased potency of ethinylestradiol relative to estradiol. Indeed, ethinylestradiol is said to have a marked effect on hepatic metabolism, and this is one of the reasons, among others, that natural estrogens like estradiol may be preferable. A 2-fold accumulation in ethinylestradiol levels with an ethinylestradiol-containing COC has been observed following 1 year of therapy.

==== Elimination ====
Ethinylestradiol is eliminated 62% in the feces and 38% in the urine.

== Chemistry ==
Ethinylestradiol, also known as 17α-ethynylestradiol or as 17α-ethynylestra-1,3,5(10)-triene-3,17β-diol, is a synthetic estrane steroid and a derivative of estradiol with an ethynyl substitution at the C17α position. The 17α-ethynylation of estradiol to create ethinylestradiol is analogous to the 17α-substitution of testosterone to make testosterone derivatives such as 17α-ethynylated progestins like ethisterone (17α-ethynyltestosterone) and norethisterone (17α-ethynyl-19-nortestosterone) as well as 17α-alkylated androgens/anabolic steroids like methyltestosterone (17α-methyltestosterone).

=== Analogues ===
A number of derivatives of ethinylestradiol exist. These include mestranol (EE 3-methyl ether), quinestrol (EE 3-cyclopentyl ether), ethinylestradiol sulfonate (EE 3-isopropylsulfonate), and moxestrol (11β-methoxy-EE). The former three are prodrugs of ethinylestradiol, while the latter one is not. A few analogues of ethinylestradiol with other substitutions at the C17α position exist. Examples include the estradiol derivatives methylestradiol (17α-methylestradiol) and ethylestradiol (17α-ethylestradiol), and the estriol derivatives ethinylestriol (17α-ethynylestriol) and nilestriol (17α-ethynylestriol 3-cyclopentyl ether). Androstane analogues of ethinylestradiol with significant although weak estrogenic activity include ethinylandrostenediol (17α-ethynyl-5-androstenediol), 17α-ethynyl-3β-androstanediol, 17α-ethynyl-3α-androstanediol, and methandriol (17α-methyl-5-androstenediol).

== History ==
Ethinylestradiol was the first orally active synthetic estrogen and was described in 1938 by Hans Herloff Inhoffen and Walter Hohlweg of Schering AG in Berlin. It was approved by the US Food and Drug Administration (FDA) in June 1943, and marketed by Schering under the brand name Estinyl. The FDA withdrew approval of Estinyl effective 4 June 2004 at the request of Schering, which had discontinued marketing it.

Ethinylestradiol was never introduced for use by intramuscular injection.

Ethinylestradiol was first used in combined oral contraceptives, as an alternative to mestranol, in 1964, and shortly thereafter superseded mestranol in combined oral contraceptives.

Early combined oral contraceptives contained 40 to 100 μg/day ethinylestradiol and 50 to 150 μg/day mestranol.

== Society and culture ==
=== Generic names ===
Ethinylestradiol is the English generic name of the drug and its INN, USAN, BAN, and JAN. It has also been spelled as ethynylestradiol, ethynyloestradiol, and ethinyloestradiol (all having the same pronunciation), and the latter was formerly its BAN but was eventually changed. In addition, a space is often included in the name of ethinylestradiol such that it is written as ethinyl estradiol (as well as variations thereof), and this is its USP name. The generic name of ethinylestradiol in French and its DCF are éthinylestradiol, in Spanish is etinilestradiol, in Italian and its DCIT are etinilestradiolo, and in Latin is ethinylestradiolum.

The name of the drug is often abbreviated as EE or as EE2 in the medical literature.

=== Brand names ===
Ethinylestradiol has been marketed as a standalone oral drug under the brand names Esteed, Estinyl, Feminone, Lynoral, Menolyn, Novestrol, Palonyl, Spanestrin, and Ylestrol among others, although most or all of these formulations are now discontinued. It is marketed under a very large number of brand names throughout the world in combination with progestins for use as an oral contraceptive. In addition, ethinylestradiol is marketed in the U.S. in combination with norelgestromin under the brand names Ortho Evra and Xulane as a contraceptive patch, in combination with etonogestrel under the brand name NuvaRing as a contraceptive vaginal ring, and in combination with norethisterone acetate under the brand name FemHRT in oral hormone replacement therapy for the treatment of menopausal symptoms.

=== Availability ===
Ethinylestradiol is marketed throughout the world. It is marketed exclusively or almost exclusively in combination with progestins.

Combination medications with additional hormones are common medications in the US.

Combination medications including ethinylestradiol in 2023
Other components	Rank	Total prescriptions	Additional sources
Norethisterone or norethisterone acetate	79	8 million	
Norgestimate	97	7 million	
Levonorgestrel	138	4 million	
Drospirenone	154	3 million	
Desogestrel	225	1 million	
Etonogestrel	170	2 million	
Norgestrel	282	700,000	
Drospirenone and levomefolic acid	285	500,000	
Etynodiol	376	6,000	
