= Moxestrol =

Chemical compound

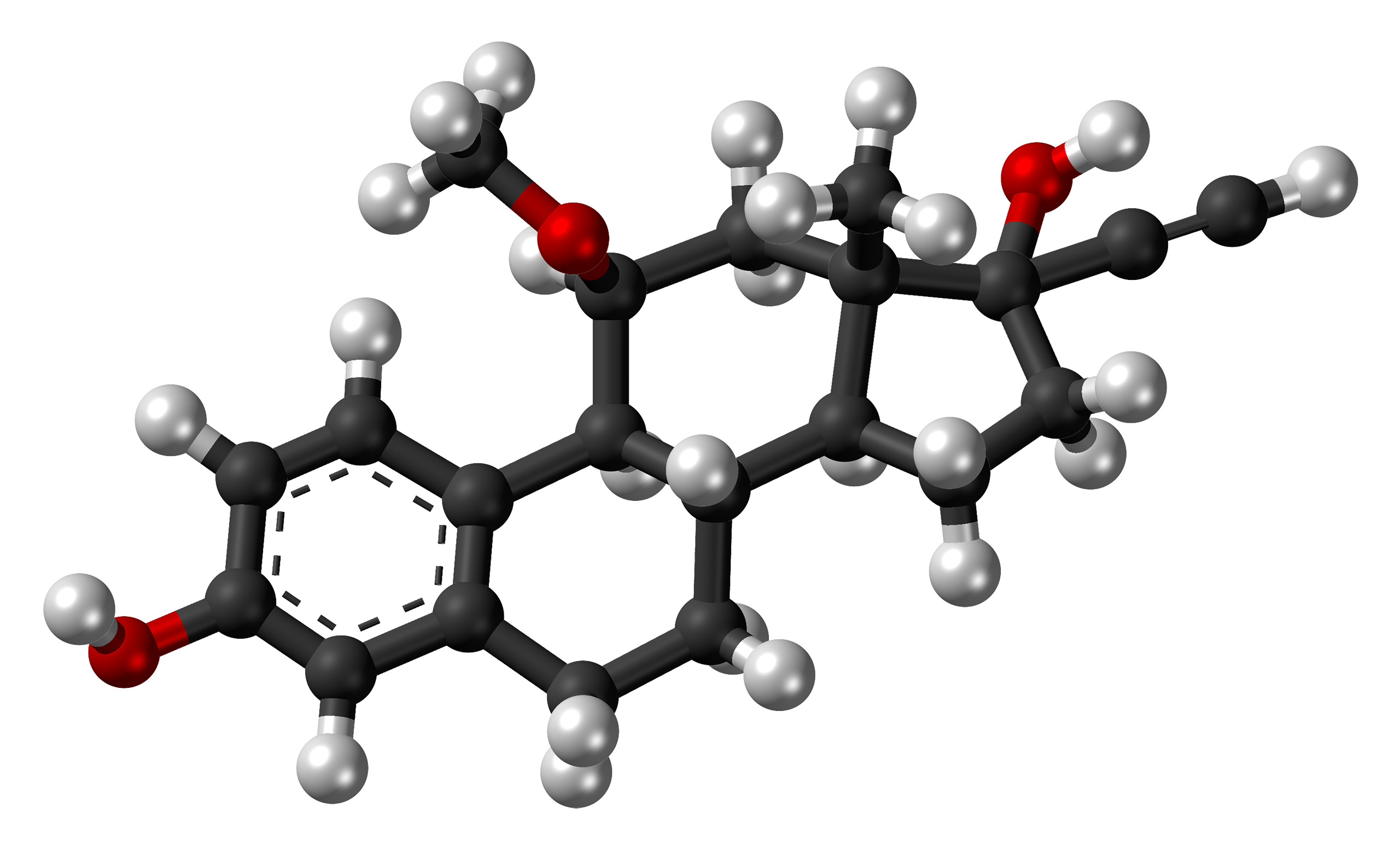

Clinical data
- Trade names: Surestryl
- Other names: R-2858, RU-2858, NSC-118191; 11β-Methoxy-17α-ethynylestradiol; 11β-MeO-EE 11β-Methoxy-17α-ethynylestra-1,3,5(10)-triene-3,17β-diol
- Pregnancy category: X (Contraindicated)
- Routes of administration: By mouth
- Drug class: Estrogen; Estrogen ether
- ATC code: G03CB04 (WHO)

Legal status
- Legal status: In general: ℞ (Prescription only)

Pharmacokinetic data
- Bioavailability: 33%
- Protein binding: Minimal
- Metabolism: Liver
- Elimination half-life: 8.2 hours

Identifiers
- IUPAC name: (8S,9S,11S,13S,14S,17R)-17-ethynyl-11-methoxy-13-methyl-7,8,9,11,12,14,15,16-octahydro-6H-cyclopenta[a]phenanthrene-3,17-diol
- CAS Number: 34816-55-2
- PubChem CID: 11954041
- ChemSpider: 10128336
- UNII: 6923NT44OW
- KEGG: C14757
- ChEBI: CHEBI:34857
- ChEMBL: ChEMBL1628161
- CompTox Dashboard (EPA): DTXSID8022375

Chemical and physical data
- Formula: C_{21}H_{26}O_{3}
- Molar mass: 326.436 g·mol^{−1}
- 3D model (JSmol): Interactive image
- SMILES: CC12CC(C3C(C1CCC2(C#C)O)CCC4=C3C=CC(=C4)O)OC
- InChI: InChI=1S/C21H26O3/c1-4-21(23)10-9-17-16-7-5-13-11-14(22)6-8-15(13)19(16)18(24-3)12-20(17,21)2/h1,6,8,11,16-19,22-23H,5,7,9-10,12H2,2-3H3/t16-,17-,18-,19+,20-,21-/m0/s1; Key:MTMZZIPTQITGCY-OLGWUGKESA-N

Moxestrol, sold under the brand name Surestryl, is an estrogen medication which has been used in Europe for the treatment of menopausal symptoms and menstrual disorders. It is taken by mouth. In addition to its use as a medication, moxestrol has been used in scientific research as a radioligand of the estrogen receptor.

== Medical uses ==
Moxestrol is or has been used in the treatment of menopausal symptoms and menstrual disorders. It has been used at dosages of 50 to 150 μg per week for long-term therapy to 25 to 250 μg per day for short-term therapy.

== Pharmacology ==
=== Pharmacodynamics ===
Moxestrol is an estrogen, or an agonist of the estrogen receptors. It is the 11β-methoxy derivative of ethinylestradiol and is one of the most potent estrogens known, being some 10 to 100 times more potent than estradiol and about 5-fold more potent than ethinylestradiol. The very high potency of moxestrol has been attributed to its high affinity for the estrogen receptor (ER), its negligible plasma binding to sex hormone binding globulin and low binding to serum albumin, and its lower relative rate of metabolism. In contrast to estradiol, which has roughly the same affinity for both ERs (K_{i} = 0.12 nM and 0.15 nM, respectively), moxestrol possesses several-fold selectivity for the ERα (K_{i} = 0.50 nM) over ERβ (K_{i} = 2.6 nM).

Relative affinities (%) of moxestrol and related steroids
Compound	PR	AR	ER	GR	MR	SHBG	CBG
Estradiol	2.6	7.9	100	0.6	0.13	8.7	<0.1
Ethinylestradiol	15–25	1–3	112	1–3	<1	?	?
Moxestrol (11β-MeO-EE)	0.8	<0.1	12	3.2	<0.1	<0.2	<0.1
RU-16117 (11α-MeO-EE)	1–3	<1	13	<1	<1	?	?
Notes: Values are percentages (%). Reference ligands (100%) were progesterone for the PR, testosterone for the AR, E2 for the ER, DEXA for the GR, aldosterone for the MR, DHT for SHBG, and cortisol for CBG. Sources:

=== Pharmacokinetics ===
The bioavailability of moxestrol is 33%. Its plasma protein binding is minimal. The medication is metabolized in the liver. Its biological half-life is 8.2 hours.

== Chemistry ==
Moxestrol, also known as 11β-methoxy-17α-ethynylestradiol (11β-MeO-EE) or as 11β-methoxy-17α-ethynylestra-1,3,5(10)-triene-3,17β-diol, is a synthetic estrane steroid and a derivative of estradiol. It is specifically a derivative of ethinylestradiol (17α-ethynylestradiol) with a methoxy group at the C11β position and a derivative of 11β-methoxyestradiol with an ethynyl group at the C17α position. The compound is the C11β isomer or C11 epimer of RU-16117 (11α-methoxy-17α-ethynylestradiol.

== Society and culture ==
=== Generic names ===
Moxestrol is the generic name of the drug and its INN. It is also known by its developmental code name R-2858 or RU-2858.

=== Brand names ===
Moxestrol is or has been marketed under the brand name Surestryl.

=== Availability ===
Moxestrol is or has been marketed in Europe.
