= Ethinylestradiol/cyproterone acetate =

Combination drug

- Ethinylestradiol (top) and cyproterone acetate (bottom)

Combination of
- Ethinylestradiol: Estrogen
- Cyproterone acetate: Progestogen; Antiandrogen

Clinical data
- Trade names: Diane, Diane-35, others
- Other names: EE/CPA; Co-cyprindiol; SHB 209 AB; SHB 209 AE; SH-81041
- Routes of administration: By mouth
- Drug class: Estrogen; Progestogen; Antiandrogen
- ATC code: G03HB01 (WHO)

Legal status
- Legal status: US: ℞-only; EU: Rx-only

Identifiers
- CAS Number: 60528-19-0
- PubChem CID: 107694

Ethinylestradiol/cyproterone acetate (EE/CPA), also known as co-cyprindiol and sold under the brand names Diane and Diane-35 among others, is a combination of ethinylestradiol (EE), an estrogen, and cyproterone acetate (CPA), a progestin and antiandrogen, which is used as a birth control pill to prevent pregnancy in women. It is also used to treat androgen-dependent conditions in women such as acne, seborrhea, excessive facial/body hair growth, scalp hair loss, and high androgen levels associated with polyendocrine metabolic ovarian syndrome (PMOS). The medication is taken by mouth once daily for 21 days, followed by a 7-day free interval.

== Medical uses ==
EE/CPA is used as a combined birth control pill to prevent ovulation and pregnancy in women. It is also approved and used to treat androgen-dependent conditions in women such as acne, seborrhea, hirsutism, female pattern hair loss, and hyperandrogenism due to polyendocrine metabolic ovarian syndrome (PMOS).

=== Available forms ===
EE/CPA comes in the form of oral tablets and contains 35 or 50 μg EE and 2 mg CPA per tablet. It is taken once daily for 21 days, followed by a 7-day free interval.

== Side effects ==
Side effects of EE/CPA include dysmenorrhea (10.2%), breast tension or tenderness (6.5%), headache (5.2%), nervousness (4.4%), chloasma (4.2%), depressed mood (3.4%), decreased libido (3.1%), varicosities (2.9%), nausea (1.9%), edema (1.7%), and dizziness (1.1%). The incidence of depression with EE/CPA is the same as that with other birth control pills.

=== Blood clots ===
The risk of venous thromboembolism with EE/CPA-containing birth control pills is similar to that with EE and gestodene-, desogestrel-, and drospirenone-containing birth control pills and about 50 to 80% higher than with EE and levonorgestrel-containing birth control pills. The absolute risk of venous thromboembolism with EE/CPA-containing birth control pills is about 1.2 to 9.9 per 10,000 women-years.

Risk of venous thromboembolism (VTE) with hormone therapy and birth control (QResearch/CPRD)
Type	Route	Medications	Odds ratio (95% CI)
Menopausal hormone therapy	Oral	Estradiol alone ≤1 mg/day >1 mg/day	1.27 (1.16–1.39)*; 1.22 (1.09–1.37)*; 1.35 (1.18–1.55)*
Menopausal hormone therapy	Oral	Conjugated estrogens alone ≤0.625 mg/day >0.625 mg/day	1.49 (1.39–1.60)*; 1.40 (1.28–1.53)*; 1.71 (1.51–1.93)*
Menopausal hormone therapy	Oral	Estradiol/medroxyprogesterone acetate	1.44 (1.09–1.89)*
Menopausal hormone therapy	Oral	Estradiol/dydrogesterone ≤1 mg/day E2 >1 mg/day E2	1.18 (0.98–1.42); 1.12 (0.90–1.40); 1.34 (0.94–1.90)
Menopausal hormone therapy	Oral	Estradiol/norethisterone ≤1 mg/day E2 >1 mg/day E2	1.68 (1.57–1.80)*; 1.38 (1.23–1.56)*; 1.84 (1.69–2.00)*
Menopausal hormone therapy	Oral	Estradiol/norgestrel or estradiol/drospirenone	1.42 (1.00–2.03)
Menopausal hormone therapy	Oral	Conjugated estrogens/medroxyprogesterone acetate	2.10 (1.92–2.31)*
Menopausal hormone therapy	Oral	Conjugated estrogens/norgestrel ≤0.625 mg/day CEEs >0.625 mg/day CEEs	1.73 (1.57–1.91)*; 1.53 (1.36–1.72)*; 2.38 (1.99–2.85)*
Menopausal hormone therapy	Oral	Tibolone alone	1.02 (0.90–1.15)
Menopausal hormone therapy	Oral	Raloxifene alone	1.49 (1.24–1.79)*
Menopausal hormone therapy	Transdermal	Estradiol alone ≤50 μg/day >50 μg/day	0.96 (0.88–1.04); 0.94 (0.85–1.03); 1.05 (0.88–1.24)
Menopausal hormone therapy	Transdermal	Estradiol/progestogen	0.88 (0.73–1.01)
Menopausal hormone therapy	Vaginal	Estradiol alone	0.84 (0.73–0.97)
Menopausal hormone therapy	Vaginal	Conjugated estrogens alone	1.04 (0.76–1.43)
Combined birth control	Oral	Ethinylestradiol/norethisterone	2.56 (2.15–3.06)*
Combined birth control	Oral	Ethinylestradiol/levonorgestrel	2.38 (2.18–2.59)*
Combined birth control	Oral	Ethinylestradiol/norgestimate	2.53 (2.17–2.96)*
Combined birth control	Oral	Ethinylestradiol/desogestrel	4.28 (3.66–5.01)*
Combined birth control	Oral	Ethinylestradiol/gestodene	3.64 (3.00–4.43)*
Combined birth control	Oral	Ethinylestradiol/drospirenone	4.12 (3.43–4.96)*
Combined birth control	Oral	Ethinylestradiol/cyproterone acetate	4.27 (3.57–5.11)*
Notes: (1) Nested case–control studies (2015, 2019) based on data from the QResearch and Clinical Practice Research Datalink (CPRD) databases. (2) Bioidentical progesterone was not included, but is known to be associated with no additional risk relative to estrogen alone. Footnotes: * = Statistically significant (p < 0.01). Sources: See template.

== Pharmacology ==
EE is a synthetic estrogen, or an agonist of the estrogen receptors, the biological target of estrogens like estradiol. It also has functional antiandrogenic effects by decreasing the circulating free fractions of androgens. CPA is a progestin (synthetic progestogen), or an agonist of the progesterone receptors, the biological target of progestogens like progesterone. It also acts as an antiandrogen, or as an antagonist of the androgen receptor, the biological target of androgens like testosterone and dihydrotestosterone. However, it is thought that the antiandrogenic activity of CPA may only be significant at higher doses than are present in birth control pills. Both EE and CPA have antigonadotropic effects and act as contraceptives in women by suppressing ovulation. The antigonadotropic effects of EE and CPA also contribute to the antiandrogenic efficacy of the medication by suppressing androgen production by the ovaries.

== History ==
CPA/EE-containing birth control pills were developed by 1975 and were first introduced for medical use in 1978. They originally contained 50 μg EE (Diane); subsequently, the EE dosage was decreased to 35 μg in a new "low-dose" preparation in 1986 (Diane-35).

== Society and culture ==
=== Generic names ===
Co-cyprindiol, a shortened form of combination of cyproterone acetate and ethinylestradiol, is a generic name of EE/CPA. It is also known by its former developmental code names SHB 209 AB (Diane) and SHB 209 AE (Diane-35). The developmental code name SH-81041 referred to a combination of high-dose 100 mg CPA and 40–50 μg EE administered in a reverse sequential regimen.

=== Brand names ===
Brand names of EE/CPA include Diane and Diane-35, as well as Adco-Fem, Alisma, Althea, Ancea, Anuar, Avancel, Axira, Bella HEXAL, Bellgyn, Bellune, Brenda-35 ED, Chloe, Clairette, Claudia, Co-Cyprindiol, Cybelle, CyEstra-35, Cypestra-35, Cyprelle, Cyprest, Cypretil, Cypretyl, Cyproderm, Cyprodiol, Cypromix, Dafne-35, Daphne, Dialider, Diane mite, Diane-35 ED, Dianette, Diclin, Dinac, Diva-35, Dixi, Dixi-35, Drina, Elestra, Elisamylan, Elleacnelle, Elzsa, Erika-35, Esdian, Estelle, Estelle-35, Eva, Evashine, Evépar, Evilin, Facetix, Femina, Feminac, Feminil mite, Frauline, Giane, Giane-35, Ginet, Ginette, Gynelle, Gyneplen, Gynofen, Holgyeme, Isbela, Jennifer-35, Juliet-35 ED, Juliette, Jene, Lady-Ten, Laila-35 ED, Linface, Lunar, Manoane, Midane, Mileva, Minerva, Morea sanol, Neynna, Nortin, OC-35, Selene, Sucee, Syndi, Tess, Visofid, Vreya, Xylia, Zinnia, and Zyrona.

=== Availability ===
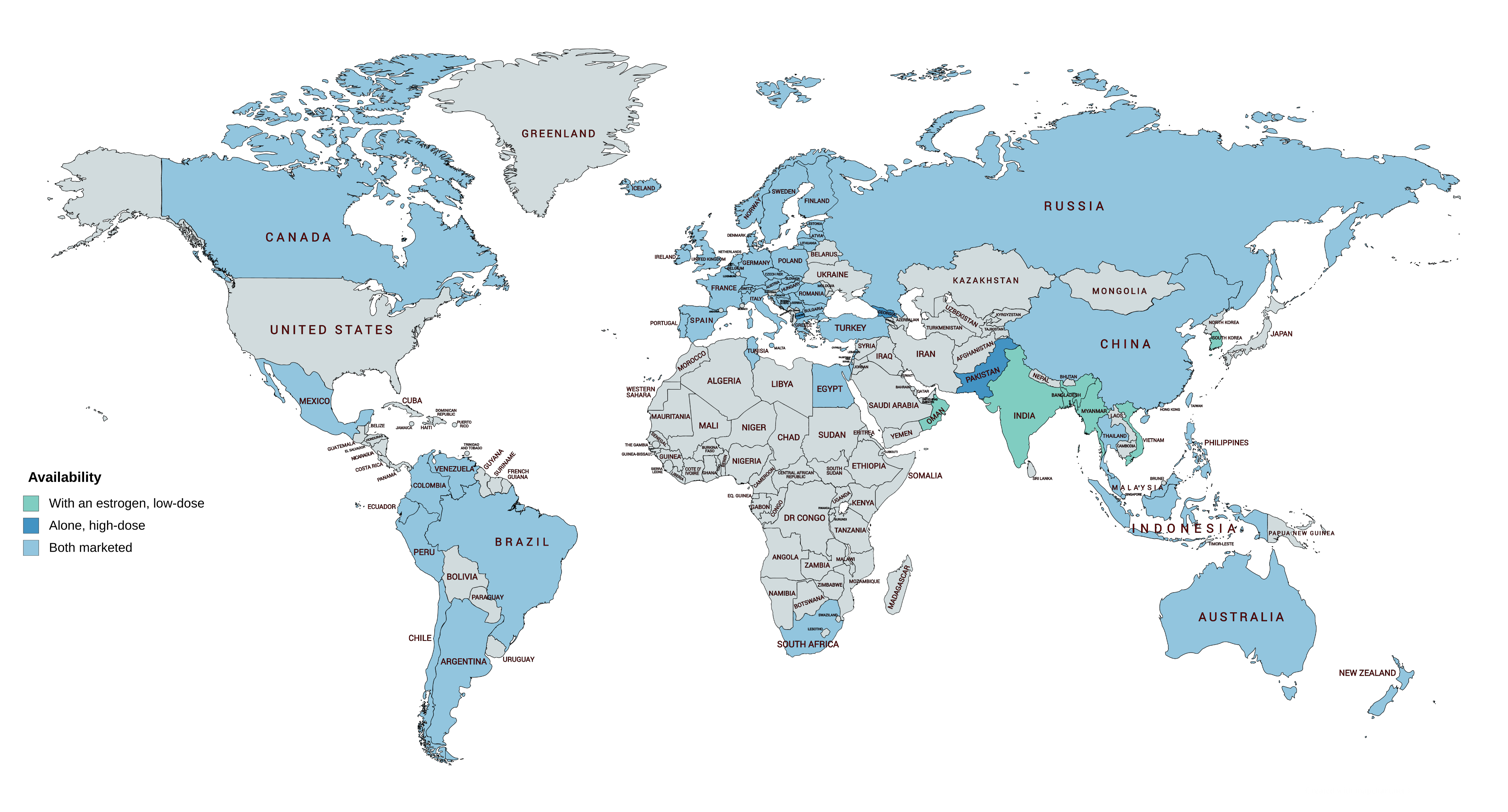
Availability of CPA in countries throughout the world (as of March 2018). Turquoise is combined with an estrogen at a low dose, dark blue is alone at a high dose, and light blue is both available.

EE/CPA is available widely throughout the world, including in Europe, North America, South America, East Asia, South Asia, Southeast Asia, and Oceania. It is notably not available in the United States or Japan.

== See also ==
- Estradiol valerate/cyproterone acetate
- List of combined sex-hormonal preparations
