= Combined hormonal contraception =

Form of hormonal contraception combining both an estrogen and a progestogen

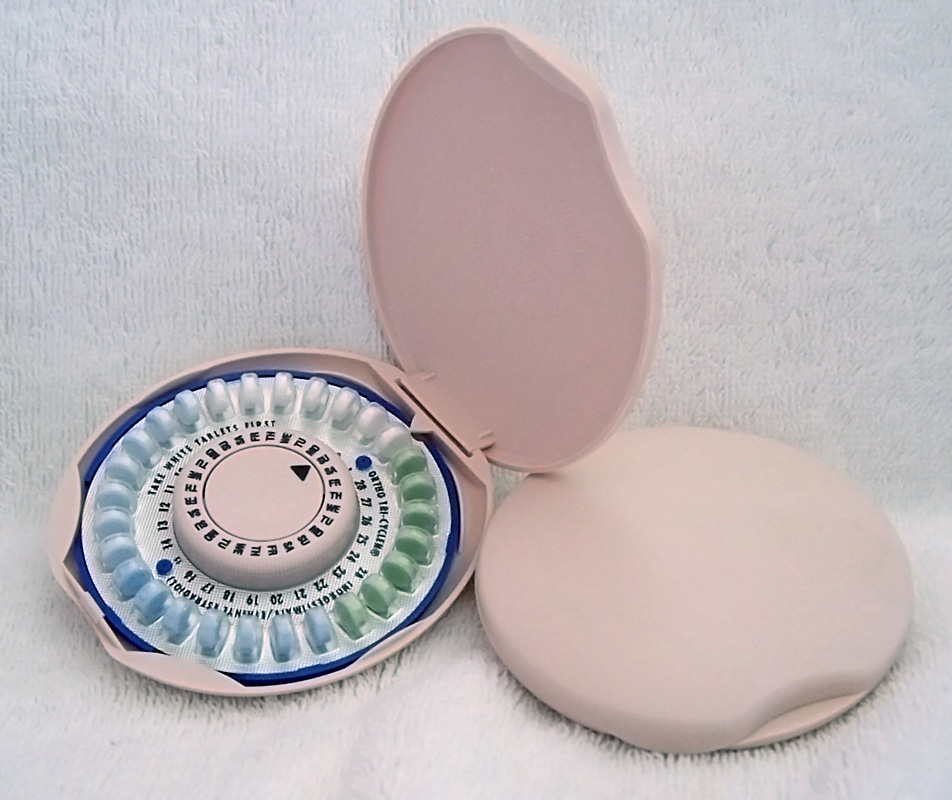
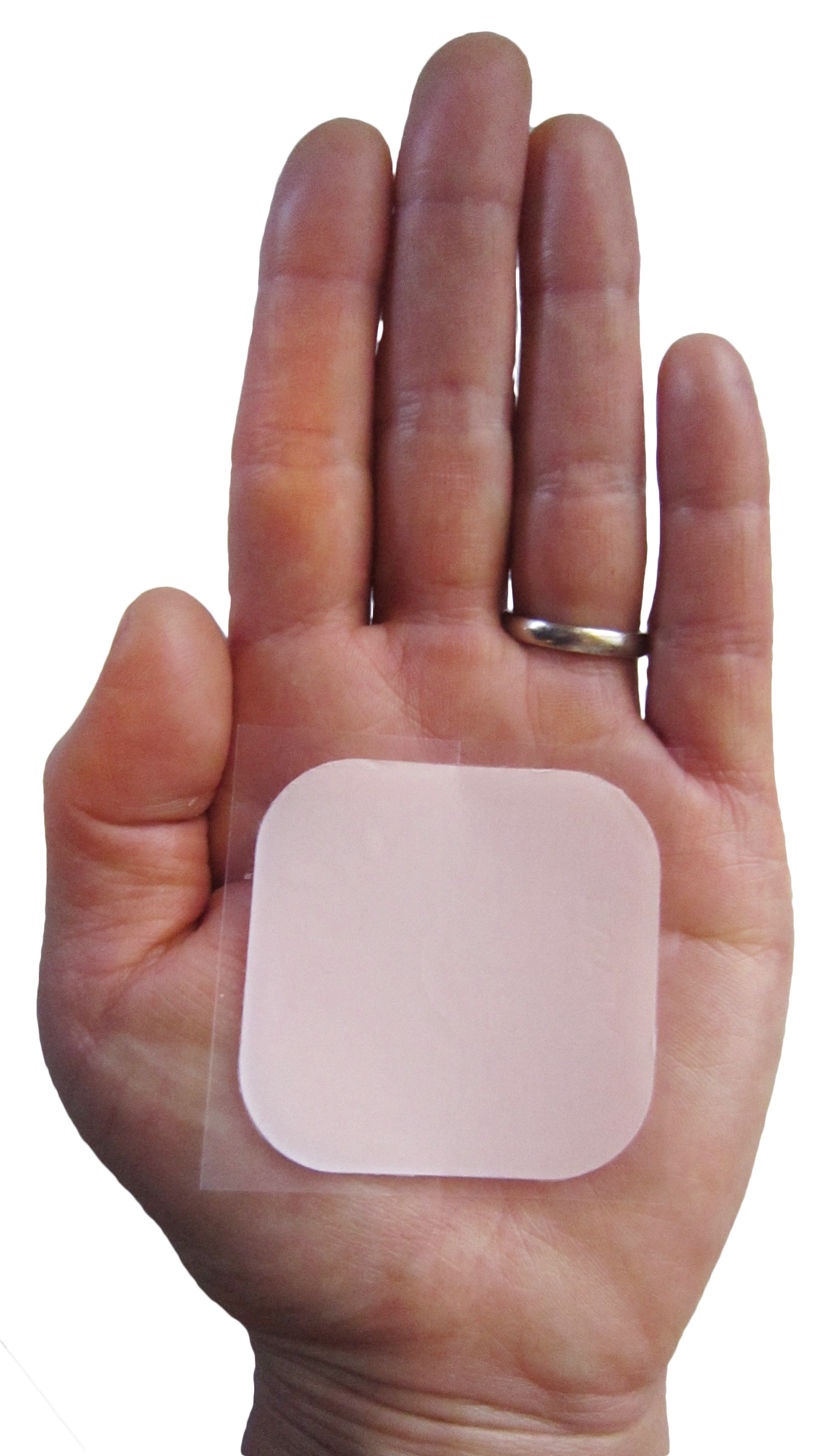
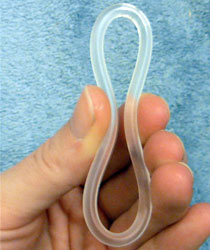
- Combined oral contraceptive pill Combined contraceptive patch Combined contraceptive vaginal ring

Background
- Type: Hormonal
- First use: oral pill - 1960; injection – 1960s; patch – 2003; vaginal ring – 2009

Failure rates (first year)
- Perfect use: 0.3%
- Typical use: 9%

Usage
- Reversibility: on discontinuation
- User reminders: ?

Advantages and disadvantages
- STI protection: No
- Periods: Typically regular and lighter
- Weight: No evidence of weight gain

Combined hormonal contraception (CHC), or combined birth control, is a form of hormonal contraception which combines both an estrogen and a progestogen in varying formulations.

The different types available include the pill, the patch and the vaginal ring, which are all widely available, and an injection, which is available in only some countries. They work by mainly suppressing luteinising hormone (LH) and follicle-stimulating hormone (FSH) and in turn preventing ovulation.

The pill, patch, and vaginal ring are all about 93% effective with typical use. Beneficial health effects include reduced risks of ovarian, endometrial and colorectal cancers. CHC can also provide improved control of some menstrual problems. Adverse effects include a small but higher risk of venous thromboembolism, arterial thromboembolism, breast cancer and cervical cancer.

== Medical use ==
=== Contraceptive use ===
With perfect use, less than 1% of women will become pregnant during the first year of using CHC. However, with typical use 9% of women will become pregnant during the first year. Traditionally, to mimic a normal menstrual cycle, CHC is used for 21 consecutive days. For all of these methods (pill, patch, vaginal ring), these 21 days are typically followed by either 7 days of no use (for the pill, patch or vaginal ring) or 7 days of administration of placebo pills (for the pill only). During these 7 days, withdrawal bleeding occurs. For those women who do not desire withdrawal bleeding or require bleeding to be suppressed completely, medication regimens can be tailored to the individual with extended periods of use and infrequent hormone-free periods. The efficacy of CHC is the same whether these methods are used continuously or with a 7-day break to allow for withdrawal bleeding.

=== Non-contraceptive use ===
Combined oral contraceptives (COCs) can be used to treat menstrual cycle disorders including heavy menstrual bleeding, and pelvic pain disorders such as endometriosis and dysmenorrhea. CHCs are also a first line treatment for polyendocrine metabolic ovarian syndrome (PMOS) for menstrual abnormalities, acne, and hirsutism.

Perimenopausal women on combined oral contraceptives have increased bone density, and COCs can be used to decrease hot flashes. Combined oral contraceptives have been shown to reduce risk of endometrial cancer, BRCA1 and BRCA2 ovarian cancer, and a modest reduction in colon cancer.

== Types ==
Types of Combined Hormonal Contraceptives	Formulation	Efficacy	Perfect Use
Combined oral contraceptive pill	Various formulations (10-50 μg estrogen (average 20–35) and 0.05–3 mg progesterone)	9% failure rate with typical use (method not used consistently or correctly) 0.3% failure rate with perfect use	Meant to be taken at the same time every day (some pills can be taken within 2–24 hours and still be effective)
Combined contraceptive patch	120-150 μg of norelgestromin and 20-35 μg ethinyl estradiol daily	9% failure rate with typical use (method not used consistently or correctly) 0.3% failure rate with perfect use	New patch used once a week, after 3 weeks patch is not worn to allow for withdrawal bleeding
Combined contraceptive vaginal ring	120-150 μg etonogestrel and 13-15 μg ethinyl estradiol daily	9% failure rate with typical use (method not used consistently or correctly) 0.3% failure rate with perfect use	Vaginal ring worn for 21 days and removed for the following 7 days to allow for withdrawal bleeding

- Combined injectable contraceptive, additional category of CHC not available in the USA or UK
- The Faculty of Sexual and Reproductive Healthcare has issued guidelines for incorrect use
- Hormonal use for 21 days followed by 7 day withdrawal is the most common regimen, however schedules are variable. Other factors affecting effectiveness include drug interactions, malabsorption and body weight.

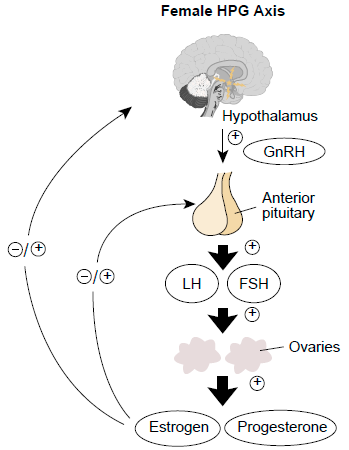
Hypothalamic-pituitary-adrenal axis

== Mechanism of action ==
Prevention of ovulation occurs via inhibition of the hypothalamic–pituitary–gonadal axis, through progesterone and estrogen providing negative feedback to the hypothalamus and inhibiting the production of gonadotropin releasing hormone (GnRH). GnRH typically promotes the release of LH and FSH from the pituitary. The presence of estrogen in CHCs results in downstream inhibition of luteinizing hormone (LH) and follicular stimulating hormone (FSH) which typically act at the ovarian level to induce ovulation and promote development of the follicle respectively. Progesterone also contributes to the contraceptive effect by making changes to the cervical mucus, endometrium and tubal motility.

== Treatment considerations ==
=== Adverse effects ===
Although the risk of venous thromboembolism, arterial thromboembolism, breast cancer and cervical cancer in CHC users is small, all CHCs are associated with higher risks of these compared to no use. Given that the vast majority of the studies evaluating these associations have been observational studies, causation between CHC use and these conditions is unable to be determined. All CHCs are associated with an increased incidence of venous and arterial thromboembolism. However, those containing higher doses of estrogen are associated with an increase in venous and arterial thromboembolism. In addition, some formulations of progesterone, including gestodene, desogestrel, cyproterone acetate and drospirenone, in combination with estrogen, have been associated with higher rates of venous thromboembolism compared to formulations containing a type of progesterone called levonorgestrel.

Other adverse effects include nausea, headaches, breast pain, skin pigmentation, irregular menstrual bleeding, absent periods and irritation from contact lenses. Changes in libido and mood, decline of liver function and raised blood pressure may also occur.

Risk of venous thromboembolism (VTE) with hormone therapy and birth control (QResearch/CPRD)
Type	Route	Medications	Odds ratio (95% CI)
Menopausal hormone therapy	Oral	Estradiol alone ≤1 mg/day >1 mg/day	1.27 (1.16–1.39)*; 1.22 (1.09–1.37)*; 1.35 (1.18–1.55)*
Menopausal hormone therapy	Oral	Conjugated estrogens alone ≤0.625 mg/day >0.625 mg/day	1.49 (1.39–1.60)*; 1.40 (1.28–1.53)*; 1.71 (1.51–1.93)*
Menopausal hormone therapy	Oral	Estradiol/medroxyprogesterone acetate	1.44 (1.09–1.89)*
Menopausal hormone therapy	Oral	Estradiol/dydrogesterone ≤1 mg/day E2 >1 mg/day E2	1.18 (0.98–1.42); 1.12 (0.90–1.40); 1.34 (0.94–1.90)
Menopausal hormone therapy	Oral	Estradiol/norethisterone ≤1 mg/day E2 >1 mg/day E2	1.68 (1.57–1.80)*; 1.38 (1.23–1.56)*; 1.84 (1.69–2.00)*
Menopausal hormone therapy	Oral	Estradiol/norgestrel or estradiol/drospirenone	1.42 (1.00–2.03)
Menopausal hormone therapy	Oral	Conjugated estrogens/medroxyprogesterone acetate	2.10 (1.92–2.31)*
Menopausal hormone therapy	Oral	Conjugated estrogens/norgestrel ≤0.625 mg/day CEEs >0.625 mg/day CEEs	1.73 (1.57–1.91)*; 1.53 (1.36–1.72)*; 2.38 (1.99–2.85)*
Menopausal hormone therapy	Oral	Tibolone alone	1.02 (0.90–1.15)
Menopausal hormone therapy	Oral	Raloxifene alone	1.49 (1.24–1.79)*
Menopausal hormone therapy	Transdermal	Estradiol alone ≤50 μg/day >50 μg/day	0.96 (0.88–1.04); 0.94 (0.85–1.03); 1.05 (0.88–1.24)
Menopausal hormone therapy	Transdermal	Estradiol/progestogen	0.88 (0.73–1.01)
Menopausal hormone therapy	Vaginal	Estradiol alone	0.84 (0.73–0.97)
Menopausal hormone therapy	Vaginal	Conjugated estrogens alone	1.04 (0.76–1.43)
Combined birth control	Oral	Ethinylestradiol/norethisterone	2.56 (2.15–3.06)*
Combined birth control	Oral	Ethinylestradiol/levonorgestrel	2.38 (2.18–2.59)*
Combined birth control	Oral	Ethinylestradiol/norgestimate	2.53 (2.17–2.96)*
Combined birth control	Oral	Ethinylestradiol/desogestrel	4.28 (3.66–5.01)*
Combined birth control	Oral	Ethinylestradiol/gestodene	3.64 (3.00–4.43)*
Combined birth control	Oral	Ethinylestradiol/drospirenone	4.12 (3.43–4.96)*
Combined birth control	Oral	Ethinylestradiol/cyproterone acetate	4.27 (3.57–5.11)*
Notes: (1) Nested case–control studies (2015, 2019) based on data from the QResearch and Clinical Practice Research Datalink (CPRD) databases. (2) Bioidentical progesterone was not included, but is known to be associated with no additional risk relative to estrogen alone. Footnotes: * = Statistically significant (p < 0.01). Sources: See template.

=== Contraindications ===
The estrogen in combined hormonal contraception can increase the risk of blood clotting in some women. In particular, this can manifest as a deep vein thrombosis or pulmonary embolism. However, the risk with low-dose combined hormonal contraceptives remain relatively low in most cases. Health providers may recommend against formulations with estrogen in women with certain risk factors including personal or family history of blood clots, pregnancy and the first 3 weeks postpartum, obesity, inactivity, and coagulation disorders. Additionally, combined hormonal contraceptives are sometimes not recommended in the first 4–6 weeks postpartum after delivery due to concerns of effect on breastfeeding performance.

Estrogens and progestins are metabolized in the liver, so there is a theoretical concern for use in women with liver disease.

Large studies have shown a slight increased incidence of breast cancer among hormonal contraceptive users compared to nonusers. However, the overall risk of breast cancer in users and nonusers remains low. Research has also shown a link between cervical cancer and long-term use of combined hormonal contraception, particularly in women with chronic HPV infection of the cervix. Combined hormonal contraceptives are also associated with a decreased risk of endometrial, ovarian, and colorectal cancers.

=== Side effects ===
The most common side-effects of combined hormonal contraceptives include headache, nausea, breast tenderness, and breakthrough bleeding. Vaginal ring use can include additional side-effects including vaginal irritation and vaginal discharge. Contraceptive skin patch use can also include a side-effect of skin irritation around the patch site. Breakthrough bleeding within the first 3–6 months is generally not harmful and often resolves with persistent use.

Contradictory research exists on the effects of combined hormonal contraceptives on weight gain. Clinical studies have shown some women report weight gain while others report weight loss. Several mechanisms for weight gain have been theorized including increased fluid retention, increase in muscle tissue, and increase in body fat. Many women stop taking combined hormonal contraceptives because they are concerned about weight gain; however, the link remains uncertain.

The effect of combined hormonal contraceptives on mood is unclear at this point. There have been some large cohort studies suggesting there may be an association with mood-related side-effects. Patient-perceived changes in mood remain one of the most common reasons for hormonal contraceptive discontinuation.

=== Drug interactions ===
==== Liver enzyme inducing drugs ====
Medications that induce liver enzymes increase the metabolism of oestradiol and progestogens and subsequently may reduce the effectiveness of CHC. The advice on CHC also depends on whether the liver inducing drug is used short term, for less than two months, or long term, for more than two months.

==== Ulipristal acetate (ellaOne) ====
Should a woman have taken ulipristal acetate (ellaOne) for emergency contraception, restarting CHC may reduce ellaOne's effectiveness, hence advice is to wait five days before commencing CHC.

==== Antibiotics ====
Extra contraceptive precautions are not necessary when using CHC in combination with antibiotics that do not induce liver enzymes, unless the antibiotics cause vomiting and/or diarrhoea.

==== Antiepileptics ====
Medications used in the treatment of epilepsy can interact with the combined pill, patch or vaginal ring, resulting in both pregnancy and shift in seizure threshold.

==== Lamotrigine ====
Based on a study of 16 women using oral CHC 30 μg ethinyloestradiol/150 μg levonorgestrel and anti-epileptic drug lamotrigine for 6 weeks, it was revealed that the contraceptive effectiveness could be lowered, despite lamotrigine not being an enzyme inducer.

An assessment of risks versus benefits of CHC is recommended in women on lamotrigine who are considering CHC, as the seizure threshold in someone on lamotrigine may be lowered by the oestrogen in CHC. In a similar mechanism, stopping CHC in a patient on lamotrigine can cause lamotrigine toxicity. Long-acting reversible contraception instead may be preferable.

== Special populations ==
Following childbirth, the use of CHC depends on factors such as whether the mother is breastfeeding and whether she has other medical conditions including superficial venous thrombosis and dyslipidaemia.

=== Age ===
When considering CHC use by age only, use is unrestricted between menarche and age 40, and can be generally used after age 40.

=== Postpartum ===
If someone is less than 21 days postpartum, they should not use combined hormonal contraceptives, according to the Centers for Disease Control and Prevention. If someone is postpartum and they also have risk factors for venous thrombosis, they should wait 21-42 days before using CHC. Within 42 days postpartum, all patients can use CHC.

=== Breastfeeding ===
CHC should not be used by breastfeeding women in the first six weeks after delivery and are generally not recommended in the first six months after delivery if still breastfeeding. After six months, breastfeeding women may use CHC.

== Epidemiology ==
Between 2015 and 2017, 64.9% of women ages 15–49 in the United States were using contraception, and of those 12.6% were using the oral contraceptive pill. There are approximately 100 million users of combined oral contraceptives worldwide, with use being more common in Western Europe, Northern Europe, and the United States. In the UK, one survey demonstrated that in 2010–2012, more than 33% of women aged 16–44 years had used oral contraception in the previous year and that it was mostly the combined type. Between 2006 and 2010 only 10% of women in the US had used the contraceptive patch, and 6% had used the vaginal ring. Combined injectables are most common in China, South-East Asia and South America.

== History ==
CHC has been used worldwide for more than 60 years, with the first clinical trials on oral CHC beginning in 1956.

The FDA first approved the oral contraceptive in 1960. The first oral contraceptive contained 100 to 175 μg of estrogen and 10 mg of progesterone. However, at these levels significant adverse effects were seen and modern preparations contain lower levels of 30 to 50 μg of estrogen and 0.3 to 1 mg of progesterone.

The first contraception vaginal ring was approved for use in the United States in 2001. Development of the ring has led to several designs with different sizes, ring materials, and steroid formulations. Modern designs are made of plastic polymer rings containing sex steroids which diffuse out of the ring directly into the vaginal epithelium and into systemic circulation.

The first birth control patch, "Ortho Evra" was first introduced in 2002. In 2014, a generic version of Ortho Evra was released and called "Xulane". In 2020, the FDA approved Twirla, a low-dose transdermal combined hormonal contraceptive.

== See also ==
- Progestogen-only contraception
- Combined oral contraceptive pill
- Contraceptive patch
- Contraceptive vaginal ring
