= Conjugated estrogens/medroxyprogesterone acetate =

Pharmaceutical combination

Combination of
- Conjugated estrogens: Estrogen
- Medroxyprogesterone acetate: Progestogen

Clinical data
- Trade names: Prempro, Premphase, Premique
- Other names: CEs/MPA; CEEs/MPA
- AHFS/Drugs.com: Professional Drug Facts
- Pregnancy category: AU: D; Contraindicated
- Routes of administration: By mouth
- ATC code: none

Legal status
- Legal status: UK: POM (Prescription only); US: ℞-only; In general: ℞ (Prescription only)

Identifiers
- CAS Number: 135843-32-2
- PubChem CID: 75124299

Chemical and physical data
- 3D model (JSmol): Interactive image
- SMILES: CC1CC2C(CCC3(C2CCC3(C(=O)C)OC(=O)C)C)C4(C1=CC(=O)CC4)C.CC12CCC3C(C1CCC2=O)CCC4=C3C=CC(=C4)OS(=O)(=O)O.CC12CCC3C(=CCC4=C3C=CC(=C4)OS(=O)(=O)O)C1CCC2=O.CC12CCC3=C(C1CCC2=O)C=CC4=C3C=CC(=C4)OS(=O)(=O)O
- InChI: InChI=1S/C24H34O4.C18H22O5S.C18H20O5S.C18H18O5S/c1-14-12-18-19(22(4)9-6-17(27)13-21(14)22)7-10-23(5)20(18)8-11-24(23,15(2)25)28-16(3)26;3*1-18-9-8-14-13-5-3-12(23-24(20,21)22)10-11(13)2-4-15(14)16(18)6-7-17(18)19/h13-14,18-20H,6-12H2,1-5H3;3,5,10,14-16H,2,4,6-9H2,1H3,(H,20,21,22);3-5,10,14,16H,2,6-9H2,1H3,(H,20,21,22);2-5,10,16H,6-9H2,1H3,(H,20,21,22)/t14-,18+,19-,20-,22+,23-,24-;14-,15-,16+,18+;14-,16+,18+;16-,18-/m0110/s1; Key:OZPWNCNLFBVVEN-RFYLDXRNSA-N

Conjugated estrogens/medroxyprogesterone acetate (CEs/MPA), sold under the brand names Prempro and Premphase, is a combination product of conjugated equine estrogens (Premarin), an estrogen collected from horse urine, and medroxyprogesterone acetate (Provera), a progestogen, which is used in menopausal hormone therapy for the treatment of menopausal symptoms.

In 2018, it was the 308th most commonly prescribed medication in the United States, with more than 1 million prescriptions.

Results of the Women's Health Initiative (WHI) menopausal hormone therapy randomized controlled trials
Clinical outcome	Hypothesized effect on risk	Estrogen and progestogen (CEs 0.625 mg/day p.o. + MPA 2.5 mg/day p.o.) (n = 16,608, with uterus, 5.2–5.6 years follow up)			Estrogen alone (CEs 0.625 mg/day p.o.) (n = 10,739, no uterus, 6.8–7.1 years follow up)		
Clinical outcome	Hypothesized effect on risk	HR	95% CI	AR	HR	95% CI	AR
Coronary heart disease	Decreased	1.24	1.00–1.54	+6 / 10,000 PYs	0.95	0.79–1.15	−3 / 10,000 PYs
Stroke	Decreased	1.31	1.02–1.68	+8 / 10,000 PYs	1.37	1.09–1.73	+12 / 10,000 PYs
Pulmonary embolism	Increased	2.13	1.45–3.11	+10 / 10,000 PYs	1.37	0.90–2.07	+4 / 10,000 PYs
Venous thromboembolism	Increased	2.06	1.57–2.70	+18 / 10,000 PYs	1.32	0.99–1.75	+8 / 10,000 PYs
Breast cancer	Increased	1.24	1.02–1.50	+8 / 10,000 PYs	0.80	0.62–1.04	−6 / 10,000 PYs
Colorectal cancer	Decreased	0.56	0.38–0.81	−7 / 10,000 PYs	1.08	0.75–1.55	+1 / 10,000 PYs
Endometrial cancer	–	0.81	0.48–1.36	−1 / 10,000 PYs	–	–	–
Hip fractures	Decreased	0.67	0.47–0.96	−5 / 10,000 PYs	0.65	0.45–0.94	−7 / 10,000 PYs
Total fractures	Decreased	0.76	0.69–0.83	−47 / 10,000 PYs	0.71	0.64–0.80	−53 / 10,000 PYs
Total mortality	Decreased	0.98	0.82–1.18	−1 / 10,000 PYs	1.04	0.91–1.12	+3 / 10,000 PYs
Global index	–	1.15	1.03–1.28	+19 / 10,000 PYs	1.01	1.09–1.12	+2 / 10,000 PYs
Diabetes	–	0.79	0.67–0.93		0.88	0.77–1.01	
Gallbladder disease	Increased	1.59	1.28–1.97		1.67	1.35–2.06	
Stress incontinence	–	1.87	1.61–2.18		2.15	1.77–2.82	
Urge incontinence	–	1.15	0.99–1.34		1.32	1.10–1.58	
Peripheral artery disease	–	0.89	0.63–1.25		1.32	0.99–1.77	
Probable dementia	Decreased	2.05	1.21–3.48		1.49	0.83–2.66	
Abbreviations: CEs = conjugated estrogens. MPA = medroxyprogesterone acetate. p.o. = per oral. HR = hazard ratio. AR = attributable risk. PYs = person–years. CI = confidence interval. Notes: Sample sizes (n) include placebo recipients, which were about half of patients. "Global index" is defined for each woman as the time to earliest diagnosis for coronary heart disease, stroke, pulmonary embolism, breast cancer, colorectal cancer, endometrial cancer (estrogen plus progestogen group only), hip fractures, and death from other causes. Sources: See template.

Risk of venous thromboembolism (VTE) with hormone therapy and birth control (QResearch/CPRD)
Type	Route	Medications	Odds ratio (95% CI)
Menopausal hormone therapy	Oral	Estradiol alone ≤1 mg/day >1 mg/day	1.27 (1.16–1.39)*; 1.22 (1.09–1.37)*; 1.35 (1.18–1.55)*
Menopausal hormone therapy	Oral	Conjugated estrogens alone ≤0.625 mg/day >0.625 mg/day	1.49 (1.39–1.60)*; 1.40 (1.28–1.53)*; 1.71 (1.51–1.93)*
Menopausal hormone therapy	Oral	Estradiol/medroxyprogesterone acetate	1.44 (1.09–1.89)*
Menopausal hormone therapy	Oral	Estradiol/dydrogesterone ≤1 mg/day E2 >1 mg/day E2	1.18 (0.98–1.42); 1.12 (0.90–1.40); 1.34 (0.94–1.90)
Menopausal hormone therapy	Oral	Estradiol/norethisterone ≤1 mg/day E2 >1 mg/day E2	1.68 (1.57–1.80)*; 1.38 (1.23–1.56)*; 1.84 (1.69–2.00)*
Menopausal hormone therapy	Oral	Estradiol/norgestrel or estradiol/drospirenone	1.42 (1.00–2.03)
Menopausal hormone therapy	Oral	Conjugated estrogens/medroxyprogesterone acetate	2.10 (1.92–2.31)*
Menopausal hormone therapy	Oral	Conjugated estrogens/norgestrel ≤0.625 mg/day CEEs >0.625 mg/day CEEs	1.73 (1.57–1.91)*; 1.53 (1.36–1.72)*; 2.38 (1.99–2.85)*
Menopausal hormone therapy	Oral	Tibolone alone	1.02 (0.90–1.15)
Menopausal hormone therapy	Oral	Raloxifene alone	1.49 (1.24–1.79)*
Menopausal hormone therapy	Transdermal	Estradiol alone ≤50 μg/day >50 μg/day	0.96 (0.88–1.04); 0.94 (0.85–1.03); 1.05 (0.88–1.24)
Menopausal hormone therapy	Transdermal	Estradiol/progestogen	0.88 (0.73–1.01)
Menopausal hormone therapy	Vaginal	Estradiol alone	0.84 (0.73–0.97)
Menopausal hormone therapy	Vaginal	Conjugated estrogens alone	1.04 (0.76–1.43)
Combined birth control	Oral	Ethinylestradiol/norethisterone	2.56 (2.15–3.06)*
Combined birth control	Oral	Ethinylestradiol/levonorgestrel	2.38 (2.18–2.59)*
Combined birth control	Oral	Ethinylestradiol/norgestimate	2.53 (2.17–2.96)*
Combined birth control	Oral	Ethinylestradiol/desogestrel	4.28 (3.66–5.01)*
Combined birth control	Oral	Ethinylestradiol/gestodene	3.64 (3.00–4.43)*
Combined birth control	Oral	Ethinylestradiol/drospirenone	4.12 (3.43–4.96)*
Combined birth control	Oral	Ethinylestradiol/cyproterone acetate	4.27 (3.57–5.11)*
Notes: (1) Nested case–control studies (2015, 2019) based on data from the QResearch and Clinical Practice Research Datalink (CPRD) databases. (2) Bioidentical progesterone was not included, but is known to be associated with no additional risk relative to estrogen alone. Footnotes: * = Statistically significant (p < 0.01). Sources: See template.

== Society and culture ==
Due to a lawsuit against pharma company Wyeth, it was revealed that Wyeth had contracted with a medical ghostwriting company to produce favorable medical literature about Prempro for marketing purposes. The ghostwriting company arranged for academics to put their names on research papers that had been prepared by the company in consultation with Wyeth. This process produced "more than 50 peer reviewed journal articles for HRT", among other material. The academics were not paid, but these ghostwritten papers helped easily pad their CVs.

== See also ==
- Estradiol/medroxyprogesterone acetate
- Estradiol cypionate/medroxyprogesterone acetate
- List of combined sex-hormonal preparations
