= 17α-Dihydroequilenin =

Chemical compound

Clinical data
- Other names: NSC-12171; α-Dihydroequilenin; 6,8-Didehydro-17α-estradiol; Estra-1,3,5(10),6,8-pentaen-3,17α-diol
- Routes of administration: By mouth
- Drug class: Estrogen

Identifiers
- IUPAC name: (13S,14S,17R)-13-methyl-11,12,14,15,16,17-hexahydrocyclopenta[a]phenanthrene-3,17-diol
- CAS Number: 6639-99-2
- PubChem CID: 223998
- ChemSpider: 194598
- UNII: D9ZR4ZMP2S
- ChEBI: CHEBI:34178
- ChEMBL: ChEMBL135236
- CompTox Dashboard (EPA): DTXSID701047939
- ECHA InfoCard: 100.026.955

Chemical and physical data
- Formula: C_{18}H_{20}O_{2}
- Molar mass: 268.356 g·mol^{−1}
- 3D model (JSmol): Interactive image
- SMILES: C[C@]12CCC3=C([C@@H]1CC[C@H]2O)C=CC4=C3C=CC(=C4)O
- InChI: InChI=1S/C18H20O2/c1-18-9-8-14-13-5-3-12(19)10-11(13)2-4-15(14)16(18)6-7-17(18)20/h2-5,10,16-17,19-20H,6-9H2,1H3/t16-,17+,18-/m0/s1; Key:RYWZPRVUQHMJFF-KSZLIROESA-N

17α-Dihydroequilenin, or α-dihydroequilenin, also known as 6,8-didehydro-17α-estradiol, as well as estra-1,3,5(10),6,8-pentaen-3,17α-diol, is a naturally occurring steroidal estrogen found in horses which is closely related to equilin, equilenin, and 17α-estradiol, and, as the 3-sulfate ester sodium salt, is a minor constituent (1.2%) of conjugated estrogens (Premarin).

== See also ==
- List of estrogens § Equine estrogens
