= 17α-Dihydroequilin =

Chemical compound

Clinical data
- Other names: α-Dihydroequilin; 7-Dehydro-17α-estradiol; Estra-1,3,5(10),7-tetraen-3,17α-diol
- Routes of administration: By mouth
- Drug class: Estrogen
- ATC code: G03CA57 (WHO)

Identifiers
- IUPAC name: (9S,13S,14S,17R)-13-methyl-6,9,11,12,14,15,16,17-octahydrocyclopenta[a]phenanthrene-3,17-diol
- CAS Number: 651-55-8
- PubChem CID: 9547222
- ChemSpider: 7826162
- UNII: 48P73794OJ
- CompTox Dashboard (EPA): DTXSID70873788
- ECHA InfoCard: 100.010.440

Chemical and physical data
- Formula: C_{18}H_{22}O_{2}
- Molar mass: 270.372 g·mol^{−1}
- 3D model (JSmol): Interactive image
- SMILES: CC12CCC3C(=CCC4=C3C=CC(=C4)O)C1CCC2O
- InChI: InChI=1S/C18H22O2/c1-18-9-8-14-13-5-3-12(19)10-11(13)2-4-15(14)16(18)6-7-17(18)20/h3-5,10,14,16-17,19-20H,2,6-9H2,1H3/t14-,16+,17-,18+/m1/s1; Key:NLLMJANWPUQQTA-SPUZQDLCSA-N

17α-Dihydroequilin, or α-dihydroequilin, also known as 7-dehydro-17α-estradiol, as well as estra-1,3,5(10),7-tetraene-3,17α-diol, is a naturally occurring steroidal estrogen found in horses which is closely related to equilin, equilenin, and 17α-estradiol. The compound, as the 3-sulfate ester sodium salt, is present in conjugated estrogens (Premarin), a pharmaceutical extract of the urine of pregnant mares, and is the third highest quantity constituent in the formulation (13.8%). The compound has been studied clinically.

== See also ==
- List of estrogens § Equine estrogens
