= Modicon =

Modicon can mean:

- Modicon, Inc., a company
  - Modicon PLC, the first programmable logic controller
- Ethinylestradiol/norethisterone, an oral contraceptive formulation
