= 17β-Dihydroequilenin =

Chemical compound

Clinical data
- Other names: β-Dihydroequilenin; Δ^{6,8}-17β-Estradiol; 6,8-Didehydro-17β-estradiol; Estra-1,3,5(10),6,8-pentaen-3,17β-diol
- Routes of administration: By mouth
- Drug class: Estrogen

Identifiers
- IUPAC name: (13S,14S,17S)-13-methyl-11,12,14,15,16,17-hexahydrocyclopenta[a]phenanthrene-3,17-diol
- CAS Number: 1423-97-8
- PubChem CID: 3032407
- ChemSpider: 2297390
- UNII: ET2MK3VGB4
- ChEMBL: ChEMBL123405
- CompTox Dashboard (EPA): DTXSID40931405

Chemical and physical data
- Formula: C_{18}H_{20}O_{2}
- Molar mass: 268.356 g·mol^{−1}
- 3D model (JSmol): Interactive image
- SMILES: C[C@]12CCC3=C([C@@H]1CC[C@@H]2O)C=CC4=C3C=CC(=C4)O
- InChI: InChI=1S/C18H20O2/c1-18-9-8-14-13-5-3-12(19)10-11(13)2-4-15(14)16(18)6-7-17(18)20/h2-5,10,16-17,19-20H,6-9H2,1H3/t16-,17-,18-/m0/s1; Key:RYWZPRVUQHMJFF-BZSNNMDCSA-N

17β-Dihydroequilenin, or β-dihydroequilenin, also known as δ^{6,8}-17β-estradiol or 6,8-didehydro-17β-estradiol, as well as estra-1,3,5(10),6,8-pentaen-3,17β-diol, is a naturally occurring steroidal estrogen found in horses which is closely related to equilin, equilenin, and estradiol, and, as the 3-sulfate ester sodium salt, is a minor constituent (0.5%) of conjugated estrogens (Premarin). 17β-Dihydroequilenin has unexpectedly shown a selective estrogen receptor modulator (SERM)-like profile of estrogenic activity in studies with monkeys, in which beneficial effects on bone and the cardiovascular system were noted but proliferative responses in breast and endometrium were not observed.

== See also ==
- List of estrogens § Equine estrogens
