= Equilin =

Chemical compound

Clinical data
- Other names: Δ^{7}-Estrone; 7-Dehydroestrone; Estra-1,3,5(10),7-tetraen-3-ol-17-one
- Routes of administration: By mouth
- Drug class: Estrogen

Identifiers
- IUPAC name: (9S,13S,14S)-3-hydroxy-13-methyl-9,11,12,14,15,16-hexahydro-6H-cyclopenta[a]phenanthren-17-one
- CAS Number: 474-86-2
- PubChem CID: 223368
- DrugBank: DB02187
- ChemSpider: 193995
- UNII: 08O86EX0J4
- KEGG: D04041
- ChEBI: CHEBI:42309
- ChEMBL: ChEMBL323533
- CompTox Dashboard (EPA): DTXSID7047433
- ECHA InfoCard: 100.006.809

Chemical and physical data
- Formula: C_{18}H_{20}O_{2}
- Molar mass: 268.356 g·mol^{−1}
- 3D model (JSmol): Interactive image
- SMILES: O=C3CC[C@H]4C/2=C/Cc1c(ccc(O)c1)[C@H]\2CC[C@]34C
- InChI: InChI=1S/C18H20O2/c1-18-9-8-14-13-5-3-12(19)10-11(13)2-4-15(14)16(18)6-7-17(18)20/h3-5,10,14,16,19H,2,6-9H2,1H3/t14-,16+,18+/m1/s1; Key:WKRLQDKEXYKHJB-HFTRVMKXSA-N

Equilin is a naturally occurring estrogen sex hormone found in horses as well as a medication. It is one of the estrogens present in the estrogen combination drug preparations known as conjugated estrogens (CEEs; e.g. Premarin) and esterified estrogens (EEs; e.g. Estratab, Menest). CEEs is the most commonly used form of estrogen medications in hormone replacement therapy (HRT) for menopausal symptoms in the United States. Estrone sulfate is the major estrogen in CEEs (about 50%) while equilin sulfate is the second major estrogen in the formulation, present as about 25% of the total.

== Pharmacology ==
=== Pharmacodynamics ===
Equilin is an estrogen, or an agonist of the estrogen receptors (ERs), the ERα and ERβ. In terms of relative binding affinity for the ERs, equilin has about 13% and 49% of that of estradiol for the ERα and ERβ, respectively. Analogously to the reversible transformation of estrone into estradiol by 17β-hydroxysteroid dehydrogenase, equilin can be converted into the more potent estrogen 17β-dihydroequilin in the body. This estrogen has about 113% and 108% of the relative binding affinities of estradiol for the ERα and ERβ, respectively. Equilin is present in CEEs in the form of equilin sulfate, which itself is inactive and acts as a prodrug of equilin via steroid sulfatase.

Similarly to synthetic estrogens like ethinylestradiol, equilin and CEEs have disproportionate effects in certain tissues such as the liver and uterus relative to bioidentical human estrogens like estradiol and estrone. Because of their disproportionate potency in the liver, equilin and CEEs have relatively increased effects on liver protein synthesis compared to estradiol.

A dosage of 0.25 mg/day equilin sulfate is equivalent to 0.625 mg/day CEEs in terms of relief from hot flashes. At a dosage of 0.625 mg/day equilin sulfate, the increases in circulating levels of sex hormone-binding globulin (SHBG), corticosteroid-binding globulin, and angiotensinogen were 1.5 to 8 times those observed with estrone sulfate. Equilin has about 42% of the relative potency of CEEs in the vagina and 80% of the relative potency of CEEs in the uterus, while its more active form, 17β-dihydroequilin, has about 83% of the relative potency of CEEs in the vagina and 200% of the relative potency of CEEs in the uterus.

Relative oral potencies of estrogens
Estrogen	HF	VE	UCa	FSH	LH	HDL-C	SHBG	CBG	AGT	Liver
Estradiol	1.0	1.0	1.0	1.0	1.0	1.0	1.0	1.0	1.0	1.0
Estrone	?	?	?	0.3	0.3	?	?	?	?	?
Estriol	0.3	0.3	0.1	0.3	0.3	0.2	?	?	?	0.67
Estrone sulfate	?	0.9	0.9	0.8–0.9	0.9	0.5	0.9	0.5–0.7	1.4–1.5	0.56–1.7
Conjugated estrogens	1.2	1.5	2.0	1.1–1.3	1.0	1.5	3.0–3.2	1.3–1.5	5.0	1.3–4.5
Equilin sulfate	?	?	1.0	?	?	6.0	7.5	6.0	7.5	?
Ethinylestradiol	120	150	400	60–150	100	400	500–600	500–600	350	2.9–5.0
Diethylstilbestrol	?	?	?	2.9–3.4	?	?	26–28	25–37	20	5.7–7.5
Sources and footnotes Notes: Values are ratios, with estradiol as standard (i.e., 1.0). Abbreviations: HF = Clinical relief of hot flashes. VE = Increased proliferation of vaginal epithelium. UCa = Decrease in UCa. FSH = Suppression of FSH levels. LH = Suppression of LH levels. HDL-C, SHBG, CBG, and AGT = Increase in the serum levels of these liver proteins. Liver = Ratio of liver estrogenic effects to general/systemic estrogenic effects (hot flashes/gonadotropins). Sources: See template.

=== Pharmacokinetics ===
Equilin has about 8% of the relative binding affinity of testosterone for SHBG, relative to 12% in the case of estrone. In terms of plasma protein binding, it is bound 26% to SHBG and 13% to albumin. The metabolic clearance rates of equilin and equilin sulfate are 2,640 L/day/m^{2} and 175 L/day/m^{2}, respectively. In accordance, the biological half-life of equilin sulfate is substantially longer than that of equilin. Equilin is converted into 17β-dihydroequilin in the liver and in other tissues. Equilin and 17β-dihydroequilin can also be transformed into equilenin and 17β-dihydroequilenin. Equilin is excreted in the form of glucuronide conjugates.

== Chemistry ==
Equilin, also known as δ^{7}-estrone or as 7-dehydroestrone, as well as estra-1,3,5(10),7-tetraen-3-ol-17-one, is a naturally occurring estrane steroid and an analogue of estrone. In terms of chemical structure and pharmacology, equilin is to 17β-dihydroequilin (δ^{7}-17β-estradiol) as estrone is to estradiol.
