= The Menopause Society =

- Founded: 1989
- Location: 30050 Chagrin Blvd., Suite 120, Pepper Pike, OH 44124, US
- Region served: North America
- Members: 7,900+
- Key people: Dr. Stephanie Faubion, medical director; Carolyn Develen, chief operating officer; Dr. Wulf Utian, founder
- Website: www.menopause.org
- Formerly called: North American Menopause Society

The Menopause Society, founded in 1989 as the North American Menopause Society, is a nonprofit, multidisciplinary organization with the mission of promoting the health and quality of life of women during midlife and beyond, through an understanding of menopause and healthy aging. Based in Cleveland, Ohio, the society has more than 7,900 members from 51 countries, with 88% of its members from North America. Its membership includes experts from many disciplines such as medicine, nursing, sociology, psychology, nutrition, anthropology, epidemiology, pharmacy, and education.

The group renamed itself the Menopause Society in 2023.

== History ==
The Menopause Society was founded in 1989 by Dr. Wulf Utian, the Arthur H. Bill Professor Emeritus of Reproductive Biology at Case Western Reserve University School of Medicine and one of the three original founders of the International Menopause Society. Utian served as the executive director of NAMS from its inception until 2009. Dr. Stephanie Faubion currently serves as medical director, and Carolyn Develen as chief operating officer.

== Resources and publications ==
In 1994, the Menopause Society launched Menopause, a peer-reviewed scientific journal meant to provide a forum for clinical research, applied basic science, and practice guidelines on all aspects of menopause. The journal's scope encompasses many varied biomedical areas, including internal medicine, family practice, obstetrics, gynecology, medical subspecialties such as cardiology and geriatrics, epidemiology, pathology, sociology, psychology, anthropology, and pharmacology. Additional professional educational material provided by NAMS includes the textbook Menopause Practice: A Clinician's Guide; position statements on hormone therapy, management of menopausal symptoms, prevention and treatment of osteoporosis, and other topics; an annual scientific conference; and the e-mail newsletters First to Know, Menopause Care Updates, and Menopause e-Consult. The Menopause Society also releases consumer educational materials such as the print resource The Menopause Guidebook and the e-mail newsletter Menopause Flashes.

== The Menopause Society Certified Menopause Practitioner program ==
The Menopause Society has developed an opportunity for licensed healthcare providers to demonstrate their expertise by passing a competency exam and becoming credentialed as a Menopause Society Certified Practitioner (MSCP). The Menopause Society provides a listing of MSCP-credentialed clinicians on its public website.

The NCMP certification is now known as Menopause Society Certified Practitioner (MSCP) after the 2023 rename.
