= Estradiol/medroxyprogesterone acetate =

Pharmaceutical drug combination

Estradiol / medroxyprogesterone acetate

- Estradiol (top) and medroxy- progesterone acetate (bottom)

Combination of
- Estradiol: Estrogen
- Medroxyprogesterone acetate: Progestogen

Clinical data
- Trade names: Indivina, Tridestra
- Other names: E2/MPA
- Routes of administration: By mouth
- Drug class: Estrogen; Progestogen

Legal status
- Legal status: US: ℞-only

Identifiers
- CAS Number: 215930-42-0
- PubChem CID: 66978539

Estradiol/medroxyprogesterone acetate (E2/MPA), sold under the brand names Indivina and Tridestra among others, is a combination product of estradiol, an estrogen, and medroxyprogesterone acetate, a progestogen, which is used in menopausal hormone therapy for the treatment of menopausal symptoms. It is taken by mouth.

Results of the Women's Health Initiative (WHI) menopausal hormone therapy randomized controlled trials
Clinical outcome	Hypothesized effect on risk	Estrogen and progestogen (CEs 0.625 mg/day p.o. + MPA 2.5 mg/day p.o.) (n = 16,608, with uterus, 5.2–5.6 years follow up)			Estrogen alone (CEs 0.625 mg/day p.o.) (n = 10,739, no uterus, 6.8–7.1 years follow up)		
Clinical outcome	Hypothesized effect on risk	HR	95% CI	AR	HR	95% CI	AR
Coronary heart disease	Decreased	1.24	1.00–1.54	+6 / 10,000 PYs	0.95	0.79–1.15	−3 / 10,000 PYs
Stroke	Decreased	1.31	1.02–1.68	+8 / 10,000 PYs	1.37	1.09–1.73	+12 / 10,000 PYs
Pulmonary embolism	Increased	2.13	1.45–3.11	+10 / 10,000 PYs	1.37	0.90–2.07	+4 / 10,000 PYs
Venous thromboembolism	Increased	2.06	1.57–2.70	+18 / 10,000 PYs	1.32	0.99–1.75	+8 / 10,000 PYs
Breast cancer	Increased	1.24	1.02–1.50	+8 / 10,000 PYs	0.80	0.62–1.04	−6 / 10,000 PYs
Colorectal cancer	Decreased	0.56	0.38–0.81	−7 / 10,000 PYs	1.08	0.75–1.55	+1 / 10,000 PYs
Endometrial cancer	–	0.81	0.48–1.36	−1 / 10,000 PYs	–	–	–
Hip fractures	Decreased	0.67	0.47–0.96	−5 / 10,000 PYs	0.65	0.45–0.94	−7 / 10,000 PYs
Total fractures	Decreased	0.76	0.69–0.83	−47 / 10,000 PYs	0.71	0.64–0.80	−53 / 10,000 PYs
Total mortality	Decreased	0.98	0.82–1.18	−1 / 10,000 PYs	1.04	0.91–1.12	+3 / 10,000 PYs
Global index	–	1.15	1.03–1.28	+19 / 10,000 PYs	1.01	1.09–1.12	+2 / 10,000 PYs
Diabetes	–	0.79	0.67–0.93		0.88	0.77–1.01	
Gallbladder disease	Increased	1.59	1.28–1.97		1.67	1.35–2.06	
Stress incontinence	–	1.87	1.61–2.18		2.15	1.77–2.82	
Urge incontinence	–	1.15	0.99–1.34		1.32	1.10–1.58	
Peripheral artery disease	–	0.89	0.63–1.25		1.32	0.99–1.77	
Probable dementia	Decreased	2.05	1.21–3.48		1.49	0.83–2.66	
Abbreviations: CEs = conjugated estrogens. MPA = medroxyprogesterone acetate. p.o. = per oral. HR = hazard ratio. AR = attributable risk. PYs = person–years. CI = confidence interval. Notes: Sample sizes (n) include placebo recipients, which were about half of patients. "Global index" is defined for each woman as the time to earliest diagnosis for coronary heart disease, stroke, pulmonary embolism, breast cancer, colorectal cancer, endometrial cancer (estrogen plus progestogen group only), hip fractures, and death from other causes. Sources: See template.

== See also ==
- Conjugated estrogens/medroxyprogesterone acetate
- Estradiol cypionate/medroxyprogesterone acetate
- List of combined sex-hormonal preparations
