= Conjugated estrogens/norgestrel =

Combination drug

- Estrone sulfate (major active component of conjugated estrogens)

- Levonorgestrel (active form of norgestrel)

Combination of
- Conjugated estrogens: Estrogen
- Norgestrel: Progestogen; Progestin

Clinical data
- Trade names: Prempak-C
- Other names: CEEs/NG
- Routes of administration: By mouth
- Drug class: Estrogen; Progestin; Progestogen

Legal status
- Legal status: US: ℞-only

Identifiers
- CAS Number: 110735-92-7

Conjugated estrogens/norgestrel (CEEs/NG), sold under the brand name Prempak-C among others, is a combination of conjugated estrogens (CEEs), an estrogen, and norgestrel (NG), a progestin, which is used in menopausal hormone therapy in postmenopausal women. It is taken by mouth and contains 0.625 or 1.25 mg CEEs and 150 μg NG (or 75 μg levonorgestrel) per tablet. The medication is no longer marketed.

== See also ==
- List of combined sex-hormonal preparations § Estrogens and progestogens
