= Bioidentical hormone replacement therapy =

Type of hormone replacement therapy with unclear efficacy

Bioidentical hormone replacement therapy (BHRT), also known as bioidentical hormone therapy (BHT) or natural hormone therapy, is the use of hormones that are identical on a molecular level with endogenous hormones in hormone replacement therapy. It may also be combined with blood and saliva testing of hormone levels, and the use of pharmacy compounding to obtain hormones in an effort to reach a targeted level of hormones in the body. A number of claims by some proponents of BHT have not been confirmed through scientific testing. Specific hormones used in BHT include estrone, estradiol, progesterone, testosterone, dehydroepiandrosterone (DHEA), and estriol.

Custom-compounded BHT is a practice almost wholly restricted to the United States and is a form of alternative medicine. It has been promoted as a panacea for many diseases and for relieving the symptoms of menopause beyond the medical objective of reducing the risk of osteoporosis. There is little evidence to support these incremental claims; the hormones are expected to have the same risks and benefits as comparable approved drugs for which there is evidence based on extensive research and regulation, except for progesterone, which may have an improved safety profile than artificial progestogens, though direct comparisons with progestins have not been made. Risks associated with the less-controlled process of compounding bioidentical hormones are not clearly understood. In addition, the accuracy and efficacy of saliva testing have not been definitively proven, and the long-term effects of using blood testing to reach target levels of hormones have not been researched.

The International Menopause Society, American Congress of Obstetricians and Gynecologists, Society of Obstetricians and Gynaecologists of Canada, The Endocrine Society, the North American Menopause Society (NAMS), United States Food and Drug Administration, American Association of Clinical Endocrinologists, American Medical Association, American Cancer Society, and the Mayo Clinic have released statements that there is a lack of evidence that the benefits and risks of bioidentical hormones differ from well-studied non-bioidentical counterparts; until such evidence is produced the risks should be treated as if they are similar; and that compounded hormone products may have additional risks related to compounding. A major safety concern in compounded BHT is that there is no requirement to include package inserts, despite the potential for serious adverse effects (including life-threatening adverse effects) associated with HRT, which can harm consumers as they are misled into believing that any hormone-related problems and dangers are exclusively related to non-bioidentical hormones, and that compounded BHT is safe and has no side effects. In reality, the risks of bioidentical hormones have not been studied to the extent of non-bioidentical hormones, so the risks are not well-understood. Regulatory bodies require pharmacies to include important safety information with conventional hormone replacement therapy (CHRT) via package inserts.

== History ==
Bioidentical hormones were first used for menopausal symptom relief in the 1930s, after Canadian researcher James Collip developed a method to extract an orally active estrogen from the urine of pregnant women and marketed it as the active agent in a product called Emmenin. It was supplanted on the market when its manufacturer, Ayerst (later Wyeth Pharmaceuticals), began producing the more-easily manufactured conjugated equine estrogens in 1941 under the brand name Premarin; by 1992, Premarin was the most widely prescribed drug in the United States.

In the 1970s, research and reports indicating risks from synthetic conjugated estrogens began to appear. Investigations determined that the addition of a progestogen to estrogen treatment reduced the risks. As early as 1980, the British Medical Journal (now The BMJ) recommended oral bioidentical progesterone as an option when side effects from synthetic progestogens otherwise mandated discontinuing treatment. In May 1998 the FDA approved Prometrium, an oral bioidentical progesterone product produced by Solvay Pharmaceutical.

Physicians John R. Lee and Jonathan Wright were pioneers in the field of BHT. Lee authored several popular books on BHT and promoted custom-compounded BHT, with the goal of achieving what he called a "natural hormone balance". He based this goal on the clinical testing of saliva to establish where "deficiencies" existed, though agencies such as the FDA and the American Congress of Obstetricians and Gynecologists state that blood and saliva testing is unreliable and biologically meaningless. Lee also believed that progesterone acted as a panacea and general health tonic for many health conditions, basing his claims on anecdotal data rather than peer-reviewed research, which has not been supported by any clinical trials. Wright also authored a popular book on BHT. Compared to previous bioidentical formulas that only used estradiol, he promoted a triple-estrogen formula called Triest, which combined three estrogens found in human females: estriol, estradiol and estrone. It was based on an unpublished study whose conclusions did account for how estrogens are processed and excreted in the body—particularly how the liver processes oral estrogens, converting most of them to estrone. No follow-up was performed by Wright to replicate these observations. Wright may have been the first proponent of BHT to use the term bioidentical—the word he coined to describe unpatentable, plant-derived molecules he believed were identical to human hormones. However, no structural crystallographic evidence has been used to support the idea that these molecules are identical to endogenous human hormones. When the Women's Health Initiative's reports on the unappreciated risks of equine estrogens were released, many prescribers of BHT used Wright's assertions (and his terminology) to proclaim the superiority of bioidentical molecules despite a lack of scientifically supported evidence. Following the publication of a popular book written by Suzanne Somers in 2006, the term bioidentical gained more prominence in popular consciousness as a "poorly understood new adjective" regarding hormone replacement therapy.

== Terminology ==
There is no single definition for the term bioidentical hormone replacement therapy; it is generally used to refer to 17β-estradiol, but other uses include plant-based or compounded estrogen products that blend estradiol with estriol and sometimes with estrone. A bioidentical hormone is defined as a molecule identical to a hormone produced by the human body (though not all allegedly bioidentical hormones sold by custom-compounding pharmacies are necessarily molecularly identical to endogenous humans). The FDA considers BHT as currently used by BHT advocates to be a marketing term, not a scientific term, and does not recognize its use. The meaning of plant-derived has also been attached to the term bioidentical, and it may also mean that the hormones are "natural"; throughout the 1990s plant-derived, compounded hormones were referred to as "natural hormone therapy". However, the term natural can be applied to all products where the principal ingredient originates from an animal, plant, or mineral source, and both bioidentical and non-bioidentical hormones can be produced from the same plant sources.

BHT is often used to refer to a set of diagnostic, prescribing, preparation and marketing practices including compounding, saliva testing, and an emphasis on countering the effects of aging rather than relieving the symptoms of menopause. This compounded BHT package has been promoted by Somers, Oprah Winfrey, and other proponents as safer and more effective than CHRT, though there is no evidence to support these claims. Compounded BHT has been marketed on the internet by pharmacies that make unfounded claims for its safety and its effectiveness for a variety of conditions.

There are a variety of FDA-approved products, made using bioidentical estrogens and micronized progesterone, used to treat the symptoms of menopause:

Hormone class	Type	Brand names	Preparations	Notes
Estrogens
Estrogens	Micronized estradiol			
Estrogens	Micronized estradiol	Estrace and others	Pill and vaginal cream	Vaginal cream for vaginal symptoms only; sourced from plants; estradiol is bioidentical until ingested and converted in the liver to estrone
Estrogens	Micronized estradiol	Alora, Climara, Esclim, Estraderm, Vivelle and others	Patch	Sourced from plants
Estrogens	Micronized estradiol	Estrogel	Transdermal gel	Sourced from plants
Estrogens	Micronized estradiol	Estrasorb	Topical cream	Sourced from plants
Estrogens	Micronized estradiol	Estring	Vaginal ring	For vaginal symptoms only; sourced from plants
Estrogens	Estradiol acetate	Femring	Vaginal ring	
Estrogens	Estradiol hemihydrate	Vagifem	Vaginal tablet	For vaginal symptoms only
Micronized progesterone
Micronized progesterone	Micronized progesterone	Prometrium	Pill	
Micronized progesterone	Micronized progesterone	Prochieve 4%	Vaginal gel	

The term synthetic is also used incorrectly in two ways: to refer to the process used to manufacture all estrogens, including bioidentical estrogens, and to compounds that interact with estrogen receptors similarly to estrogen molecules but are not found in nature. Examples of the latter two include diethylstilbestrol and ethinylestradiol.

== Uses ==
BHT is used to reduce the symptoms of menopause. It is also promoted by some practitioners for anti-aging purposes providing benefits beyond menopausal symptom relief, such as improving quality of life, though there is little evidence to support these claims.

== Components and compounding ==
Compounded preparations of bioidentical hormones usually include estriol, estrone, estradiol, testosterone, progesterone, and sometimes dehydroepiandrosterone (DHEA), either individually or combined. They are promoted as natural, safer and (in some cases) more efficacious than CHT; however, there are no scientific studies to support claims of superiority of BHT over CHRT. Estimates from sales of bulk hormones for compounding suggest that more than one million women may be using compounded BHT in the United States. Bioidentical hormones are expected to have the same risks as conventional hormones made with the same categories of hormones.

=== Estrogens ===
In premenopausal women the majority of estrogen produced by the body is estradiol (produced primarily in the ovaries), while in postmenopausal women estrone (produced in fat cells) is the type of primary estrogen present; however, the body is able to convert one type of estrogen into another to a certain extent. Because of the limited research into potency, delivery methods, and conversion of the various estrogens, a valid scientific understanding of compounded estrogen products has not been achieved. Synthetic estradiol, taken orally, decomposes when absorbed in the gastrointestinal tract and delivers bioidentical estradiol to the bloodstream.

The hormone estriol, produced during pregnancy, is frequently compounded into bioidentical preparations in the United States. While some think it to be a weaker estrogen, with a more limited period of effectiveness than estradiol, it has been demonstrated to be a stronger estrogen in certain ways. Though initial research in the 1970s suggested possible use, follow-up studies have failed to confirm this potential. Estriol is not found in any FDA-approved drug, and its safety and effectiveness as a hormone supplement is unknown.

Estriol was part of the United States Pharmacopeia before FDA approval was needed for its use. Its approval was grandfathered in by the FDA until 2008 when the agency banned its use, stating that manufacturers of estriol would have to create a new application and estriol would be treated as a new drug. Its use is not approved by Health Canada; estriol is not available as a pharmaceutical preparation in Canada or the United States, but is a commonly prescribed conventional treatment in other countries and is available as a cream or vaginal suppository in the United Kingdom and the European Union. Estradiol is available as brand-name products in both oral and transdermal forms.

=== Progesterone ===
Progesterone is used both orally and transdermally. Oral progesterone is micronized (ground) to increase availability and is approved by the FDA to treat endometrial hyperplasia when used in opposition to estrogen. It has also been approved to relieve menopausal symptoms, either alone or in combination with estrogen. It is more reliable in treating menopausal sleep disorders than synthetic progestins. Transdermal progesterone is often used as a component of compounded BHT but has not been clinically proven to prevent endometrial hyperplasia, as oral progesterone has. The editors-in-chief of the scientific journal Climacteric state that the greatest difference in function between bioidentical and synthetic hormones may be found in progesterone's behavior compared with progestin. Laboratory studies have suggested that bioidentical progesterone binds primarily to progesterone receptors, while synthetic progestins activate other receptors with a variety of effects. The editors suggested that progesterone may have neutral to positive effects on the cardiovascular system, and induce apoptosis in breast epithelial cells. These compounds have not been directly compared with each other in appropriate scientific tests, though as of 2010 trials had begun. Progesterone is approved for use by both the FDA and Health Canada as a brand-name oral preparation. The French epidemiological study "Etude Epidemiologique aupres de femmes de l'Education Nationale" suggested micronized progesterone may offer a reduced risk of breast cancer compared to other progestins, though large-scale clinical trials have not been conducted. A 2012 practice advisory published by Canadian Family Physician concluded "there is no convincing evidence that bioidentical hormones are safer or more effective than synthetic HRT".

=== Other hormones ===
Testosterone supplementation can improve libido in postmenopausal women, but can also reduce levels of high-density lipoproteins. Commercial sources for testosterone for women in the United States are limited and include the estrogen-testosterone mixture Estratest; compounding pharmacies are the main source of testosterone-only preparations for women. A testosterone patch has been approved for use in the United Kingdom and European Union, but in Canada and the United States there is no long-term safety data on it.

DHEA is an androgen precursor that lacks FDA and Health Canada approval for use in women, and is not available in Canada as a pharmaceutical preparation; it is sold as an over-the-counter drug or incorporated into compounded preparations in the United States. In the body, it can be converted into testosterone then estrogen; there are no consistent scientific findings or safety information supporting its use. High levels of DHEA have been linked to breast cancer.

=== Compounding ===
Compounding pharmacies use commercially available bulk drugs to create new formulations which differ in form or dosage from those manufactured on a large scale by pharmaceutical companies. Custom-compounded BHT is almost wholly restricted to the United States, where pharmacy compounding is governed at the state level while the FDA has regulatory authority over the compounded product. Some internet-based compounding pharmacies understate harm and claim benefits of compounded BHT beyond what can be proven by evidence-based medicine, and many of their claims exceed those made by other BHT practitioners.

== Adverse effects ==
BHT benefits and adverse effects are expected to be the same for bioidentical and synthetic hormones. Dosages used in BHT can be as high as ten times the oral dose provided by comparable HRT regimens; the hormones used are known to adversely impact biological markers of cardiovascular disease and may produce a substantially higher risk of heart attack or stroke. There are potentially serious adverse effects and important safety information that is required to be given with FDA approved HRT as package inserts; however, they are typically not given (or required) with compounded bioidentical preparations, which has caused consumers to falsely assume that bioidenticals are safer than FDA-approved hormones or lack any adverse effects—one of the concerns expressed about the hormones. BHT has also been associated with endometrial cancer.

=== Estrogens ===
Less common (but serious) side effects of all post-menopausal estrogens include increased risk or severity of breast, ovarian or uterine cancer; stroke; heart attack; blood clots; dementia; gallbladder disease; high blood pressure, liver problems; high blood sugar, fluid retention, enlargement of benign tumors (fibroids) of the uterus; a spotty darkening of the skin, especially on the face (melasma); and vaginal yeast infection.

==== Estradiol ====
Estradiol only recommended for use for the shortest period of time and at the lowest effective dose due to its adverse-effects profile. There is the potential for a range of adverse effects in breasts, skin, eyes, cardiovascular, gastrointestinal, genitourinary or central nervous systems.

=== Progesterone ===
Progesterone can cause the emergence (or significant worsening) of abdominal pain, constipation, yeast infections, breast cancer, cystitis, acne, conjunctivitis, thrombotic disorders resulting in pulmonary embolus, strokes or heart attacks, epilepsy, migraine, asthma, and cardiac or renal dysfunction. Psychiatric reactions can include emotional instability, depression, aggression, decreased libido, and drowsiness. Adverse effects can also occur in the urinary, central or peripheral nervous, or musculoskeletal systems. A review of clinical trials studying bioidentical progesterone use found that it was ineffective in managing vasomotor symptoms of menopause, but had mild and self-limiting side effects.

== Administration ==
Hormones can be administered in a variety of ways, including percutaneous skin and vaginal creams, oral pills, topical gels, vaginal rings and tablets, and transdermal patches. Although all preparations of a given type of estrogen may be molecularly identical before their introduction into the human body, estrogens administered orally are modified by the liver before entering the bloodstream and most of it is converted to estrone; estrogen bypassing the digestive tract and liver via the skin is not converted to a new form before entering the bloodstream. Creams and gels applied to the skin also enter the blood directly and without modification but absorption of the gels, creams, and patches can vary from application to application, depending on the temperature and condition of the skin.

== Criticisms ==
Advocates for BHT have claimed that commonly compounded BHT preparations are not commercially available, but there are many FDA-approved hormone preparations containing bioidentical molecules available both as proprietary or generic brands. The exception is estriol, used in the compounded bioidentical preparations Triest and Biest—in 2008, the FDA banned estriol until a New Drug Application was completed; these preparations are not approved by the FDA or Health Canada. Some advocates of compounding have also claimed that customized compounding provides customized results, but the claim is weak since compounding is aimed at producing a single hormone profile with absolute blood or saliva levels—which has not been demonstrated to be better than CHRT—and does not consider the rate at which individuals will differ in the activity, metabolism and excretion of the hormones. There have been no clinical trials directly comparing the effectiveness or efficacy of bioidentical versus non-bioidentical compounds.

A 2010 article published in The Medical Letter on Drugs and Therapeutics concluded that "[t]here is no acceptable evidence that 'bioidentical' hormones are safe or effective. Patients should be discouraged from taking them."

=== Salivary testing and compounding ===
BHT is frequently associated with the testing of saliva to establish a baseline hormone level and compounding of the substances by pharmacists (according to a doctor's advice) to produce preparations (and blood levels) of hormones that are specific to each patient. There is no research demonstrating any benefit to either of these practices. Although promoters of BHT claim that saliva testing can be used to customize hormone levels for individuals, and tests are used to determine which hormones are supposed to be deficient and require supplementation, there is no scientific basis to support the use of saliva testing. Estrogens are secreted in pulses within and over days, resulting in varying levels in saliva. Certain compounding formulations also attempt to use a single profile for all women, with no evidence that a specific profile is beneficial in all cases and no recognition that women differ in their sensitivity to hormones and metabolic rate. Testing-based customizing also does not account for much of the effects, and synthesis of hormones occurs within tissues rather than in the blood, so blood or saliva hormone levels may not necessarily reflect the actual biological activity. Other concerns include lack of evidence that samples are stable during storage and transportation, poor replication of results and considerable variation among assays. There are also no studies that link symptoms with blood or saliva hormone levels. The FDA recommends adjusting hormone therapy to the symptoms of the patient, and that there is no reason to adjust the dosing or monitor patients receiving BHT. BHT skeptics have also pointed out that there is no certainty regarding hormone levels in the body. The North American Menopause Society has supported warnings about the potential harm BHT could cause, as it unnecessarily compounds drugs that are already FDA-approved in ways that lack an evidence base of safety or harm. The warnings are supported by the Society of Obstetricians and Gynaecologists of Canada.

Although promoted as a way of customizing treatment, hormone therapy does not require customization; the use of testing to determine the number of hormones administered could result in the dose being higher than the minimum recommended level to alleviate symptoms, or the administration of unnecessary hormones to asymptomatic women may result in greater risks to the patient. Analysis of the material used to promote BHT suggests that rather than basing hormone doses on saliva results, practitioners are adjusting dosage based on symptoms. Different bioidentical preparations result in mixtures with different strengths, and practitioners using compounded formulations may be unaware of the total dose of hormones their patients receive. In a 2001 test of compounded bioidentical hormone products, the FDA found that 10 out of 29 products failed their quality tests; nine out of ten failed potency tests (comparable rates for drug manufacturers were less than 2% and 0.13%, respectively). A 2006 test found potency levels ranging from 67.5% to 268.4% of the potency specified on the label; some samples were mixtures of different hormones with some being above, and others below, the specified potency. The failure of potency testing could be problematic and dangerous for progesterone products, where specific levels of progesterone are required to protect the endometrium against precancerous hyperplasia.

Boothby, Doering, and Kipersztok summarize the issue as being a poor effort to apply principles of pharmacokinetics to achieve individualized dosing for drugs that do not require it.

Saliva testing has not been shown to accurately measure blood-bound hormone levels. The FDA recommends the lowest dose of hormones that effectively relieve symptoms and does not recommend custom compounding, blood or saliva testing.

=== Lack of evidence for claims ===
Bioidentical hormones have been advertised, marketed and promoted as a risk-free panacea that is safer than standard HRT. Literature reviews by private practitioners who sell bioidentical preparations suggest benefits and advantages of BHT over its conventional counterpart, but there is skepticism over claims made about BHT; there is no peer-reviewed evidence that compounded bioidentical hormones are safer or more effective than FDA-approved formulations or that they carry less risk. The hormones are expected to carry the same risks as their conventional counterparts, while the risks of including estriol—a hormone normally produced in large amounts only in pregnant women—have not been studied. The United States FDA warned that claims about compounded BHT products are unsupported by medical evidence. Bioidentical hormones have been described as a form of marketing; the chief medical editor of Endocrine Today called compounded BHT a "marketing concept" with no scientific backing, and the FDA warned that pharmacies use these terms to imply that the drugs are natural and have the same effects as endogenous hormones. Other claims include compounded BHT's ability to prevent or treat conditions such as heart disease, stroke, Alzheimer's disease, endometrial and breast cancer; fewer side effects; and custom blending to uniquely address individuals. There is no credible evidence to support these claims. Bioidentical hormones and compounded BHT are expected to have the same risks and benefits as CHRT; the latter benefits from years of study and regulation, while compounded BHT has no scientific data to support claims of superior safety or efficacy. The following specific claims have been made for the efficacy of bioidentical hormones and compounded BHT, with varying evidence to support or contradict them:

Claim	Evidence
Bioidentical hormones fit precisely into human hormone receptors while conventional hormones fit "cockeyed"; this mismatch causes serious side effects	Synthetic progestins and endogenous progesterone have different binding affinities for different receptors, depending on the model and animal used; these differing pharmacodynamics have not been associated with specific side effects
The body is unable to metabolize synthetic hormones	The biological half-life for synthetic hormones is between five minutes and two days
Lack of progesterone causes irregular or painful, heavy menses	Oral progesterone is no more effective than placebo at alleviating symptoms of premenstrual syndrome
Progesterone can counteract stress, increase metabolism and decrease abdominal fat	There is no evidence to support weight loss due to progesterone
"Normal" levels of progesterone protect against breast cancer	The claim is based on a single study of infertile patients during child-bearing years. Some evidence exists supporting a link between hormonal treatment for infertility and a reduced risk of breast cancer, but these benefits may not translate to women seeking relief from the symptoms of menopause
Progesterone therapy can prevent cardiovascular disease and atherosclerosis, and raise high-density lipoprotein	The use of micronized progesterone does not affect cardiovascular risk
The side effects reported in the Women's Health Initiative study were due to the synthetic nature of the hormones used	"Cardiovascular benefit has not been proven with micronized progesterone in observational or experimental research...a multicenter, case-control study was conducted in postmenopausal women aged 45–70 years to examine potential differences in cardiovascular risk between the subtypes of synthetic progestins and micronized progesterone...Micronized progesterone and pregnane derivatives were not associated with an increased venous thromboembolism risk, whereas norpregnane derivatives...were associated with an increased risk of thromboembolism...Thus, certain progestins are associated with increased cardiovascular risk, whereas pregnane derivatives and micronized progesterone neither increase nor decrease cardiovascular risk in the doses studied"
Proponents to claim that bioidentical hormones, in addition to the demonstrated benefit of improving bone-mineral density, protecting the eyes and skin from drying out, regulating the menstrual cycle, improving mental function, improving blood cholesterol and reducing hot flashes and night sweats associated with menopause	There is no published evidence (derived from controlled research) supporting the claims of superior beneficial effects for bioidentical hormones as compared to conventional hormone therapy. Risk data have been published for conventional hormone therapy, and CHRT is not recommended to manage any chronic diseases, or for the prevention of cardiovascular disease
Estriol can decrease the risk of breast cancer	Estriol has been shown to cause breast cancer cell growth
Pharmacists use their expertise regarding bioidentical hormones to meet the needs of their clients and improve health outcomes	Compounding is a legitimate practice, but there is no evidence that clearly illustrates the benefits and risks of BHT

In 2006, Somers released the book Ageless: The Naked Truth About Bioidentical Hormones endorsing the use of bioidentical hormones. The book was criticized by a group of doctors who (though generally supportive of BHT) state that more research is required, and object to protocols mentioned in the book—because of their potential danger and the promoters' lack of qualifications. Somers' book may have increased awareness of the existence of BHT for a growing number of menopausal women, but also may have caused confusion by making unsubstantiated claims for BHT and referring to bioidentical hormones as non-drug products with fewer risks. Bioidentical hormones have also been discussed on The Oprah Winfrey Show, with Somers as a guest.

Michael Cirigliano and Judi Chervenak have stated in reviews of the literature on BHT that large-scale, peer-reviewed studies should be used to establish the safety, efficacy and beliefs about the use of bioidentical hormones. Two 2008 studies conducted in France found that estradiol plus micronized progesterone did not increase the incidence of breast cancer, while a comparison of estradiol plus different types of progestins found a reduced risk of invasive breast cancer with micronized progesterone. Christine Derzko stated that the evidence supported the use of bioidentical estrogen plus progesterone, but since the trial was an observational cohort study rather than a randomized controlled trial that compared different types of hormones head-to-head, more data was required before concluding bioidentical hormones were safer and preferred. Derzko concluded that there was weak (but promising) preliminary evidence that bioidentical hormones may present equal (or possibly lower) risks than conventional HRT; however, there was no data supporting the use of compounding. Derzko recommended following evidence-based medicine and cited concerns over BHT by numerous medical organizations—requirements for oversight over compounding, black box warnings for all bioidentical products, and the establishment of mandatory adverse-events registry.

M. Sarah Rosenthal, Director of the University of Kentucky Program for Bioethics and Patients' Rights, has stated that she believes BHT is an experimental therapy that is often prescribed by practitioners who sell the products, and are thus in an unethical position of conflict of interest. Rosenthal has also described problematic issues with BHT including patients receiving information from popular books while lacking the scientific literacy to separate rhetoric from evidence about hormone replacement, illegitimate claims of a "big pharma" conspiracy to suppress bioidentical prescribing, the extra and unnecessary cost of the products that are often not covered by insurance plans, and the inaccurate depiction of bioidentical prescribing as "cutting edge science" rather than unproven alternative medicine.

=== "Natural" claims ===
Bioidentical hormones are frequently marketed as being "natural", or more natural than conventional HRT. The term natural can be used to suggest or emphasize a variety of different ideas—similarity with endogenous hormones, extraction from a plant-based source, and that the hormones are not manufactured or synthesized.

- Endogeny: this meaning of natural implies that the hormones are molecularly identical to those found within the body. However, BHT is unnatural as it opposes the biologically determined declining levels of fertility hormones in aging women and medicalizes a stage of human life that is probably normal. Most of the conjugated equine estrogens extracted from pregnant horse urine (such as Premarin) are converted to human estrogens once they enter the body. However, not all are converted, and BHT advocates allege that the small amount that is not converted may have some harmful effects. This is still being studied.
- Plant-derived: Women who purchase compounded BHT are more likely to associate natural with the idea that the hormones are derived from plant sources. However, both bioidentical and non-bioidentical hormones are sourced from the same plants, generally soy beans or yams.
- Manufacturing: both bioidentical and non-bioidentical hormones are synthesized using the same chemical precursors; diosgenin is extracted from soy or yam plants, converted into progesterone and used as a hormone chemical precursor to create the final product. "Natural" is also used to promote the idea of being unmodified, and containing the "goodness" of a pure substance. However, this argument simultaneously draws upon a scientific discourse and methodology; even hormones called "bioidentical" have been heavily processed and converted in a pharmaceutical lab. Premarin (conjugated estrogens extracted from the urine of pregnant horses) contains the only truly "natural" hormones—natural in the sense of being completely unmodified beyond blending the estrogens to achieve a specific ratio.

The monthly newsletter Harvard Women's Health Watch, published by Harvard Medical School, states that natural does not automatically mean safe, and that it can be used to indicate any product with an animal, plant, or mineral source—including hormones that are not bioidentical (such as Premarin), as well as the molecules extracted from soybean and yam sources used in many bioidentical and non-bioidentical commercial preparations.

=== Cost ===
Compounded BHT may be more expensive than conventional, FDA-approved HRT, and is often not covered by health insurance.

== Safety ==
Bioidentical hormones are expected to carry the same risks and benefits as their non-bioidentical counterparts, but there have been no studies that directly compare compounded bioidentical hormones with their non-bioidentical counterparts. Hormones—as used in CHRT—have been studied for years and their risk, benefit, and effectiveness profiles are known and demonstrated through considerable research.

In 2002, the Women's Health Initiative study (WHI) that was designed to demonstrate additional benefits of conventional hormone therapy (study participants were given Prempro or a placebo) was terminated prematurely after preliminary data indicated small increases in the risks of breast cancer, heart attack and stroke in older women using Prempro. Its early termination and the subsequent publicity about these previously unappreciated risks led to a decline in prescriptions for CHRT. The results from the study were used by BHT prescribers to promote bioidentical hormones as safer than the FDA-regulated preparations despite a lack of evidence; according to the FDA, the results found by the study apply to all estrogens. BHT has since been strongly promoted as a natural alternative with fewer risks than CHRT, though there is no evidence to support this claim. BHT practitioners recommend compounded products due to their claim that they more closely mimic the composition and ratio of circulating hormones in a woman's body than do commercially manufactured products.

The Endocrine Society issued a position statement that bioidentical hormones carry essentially the same risks and benefits as non-bioidentical molecules. In February 2009 the American Congress of Obstetricians and Gynecologists reiterated its position (from November 2005) that there are no proven benefits in regard to the safety or efficacy of compounded bioidentical hormones, nor are there any benefits in salivary testing of hormone levels or customized dosing of hormones. The Mayo Clinic states that there is no evidence that pharmacy-compounded BHT is safer or more effective than conventional hormone replacement, and that some bioidentical hormones are already available in certain FDA-approved products. The American Cancer Society also stated that "natural" and "bioidentical" hormones present the same risks as synthetic hormone replacement therapy such as heart disease, blood clots, strokes and an increased risk of breast cancer with long-term use.

The U.S. Food and Drug Administration has warned several pharmacies about making unsubstantiated claims about the safety and effectiveness of compounded hormone products. The North American Menopause Society has stated that compounded bioidentical hormones have not been approved by the FDA; there is no guarantee of purity, potency, efficacy or safety, and they may contain unknown contaminants. The Australian Menopause Society has similarly stated that there is no evidence that bioidentical hormones administered using lozenges are any safer than their approved counterparts. The International Menopause Society has stated "There are no medical or scientific reasons to recommend unregistered 'bioidentical hormones'. The measurement of hormone levels in the saliva is not clinically useful. These 'customized' hormonal preparations have not been tested in studies and their purity and risks are unknown."

In November 2006, the American Medical Association adopted a policy requesting that the FDA better monitor and regulate bioidentical hormones, releasing an editorial stating that compounded bioidentical molecules were expected to have the same risks as conventional hormones until proven otherwise.

Deborah Moskowitz published an article suggesting that some forms of bioidentical hormones may be safer than non-bioidentical hormones in safety and effectiveness, though this review was criticized for "[attempting] to demonstrate that BHT has a good safety profile, but the data presented only serve to demonstrate similar risks to conventional HRT."

Quackwatch recommends against the use of bioidentical hormones due to lack of quality control over compounding, posing the same risks as conventional hormones, the use of unnecessary saliva testing, and including the non-FDA-approved hormone estriol. Stephen Barrett, the site's owner, concludes his review with: "The bottom line for consumers is very simple: Steer clear of anyone who prescribes "bioidentical" hormones or recommends saliva testing as the basis for evaluating hormone status."

== Regulatory status in the United States ==
Compounded BHT is used almost exclusively in the United States, and many FDA-approved formulations that are wholly or partially made of bioidentical hormones are available. Topical hormone preparations such as progesterone, estrogen and DHEA creams can be purchased in stores or over the internet and are not regulated by the FDA, as they are generally considered cosmetic.

When prescribed by a licensed practitioner, the compounding of bioidentical hormones is controlled by the state pharmacy boards rather than the FDA, and pharmacists are permitted to adjust dose and delivery method according to the prescription. However, the FDA does have authority over the compounded product. In 2001 the FDA surveyed a limited number of compounded preparations, including eight hormone compounds. All three estradiol products passed every test; however, two out of five progesterone products failed at least one test of potency, content or uniformity.

In October 2005 Wyeth Pharmaceuticals, a manufacturer of both FDA-approved bioidentical and non-bioidentical HRT preparations, filed a citizen petition with the FDA asking for enforcement action against compounding pharmacies that dispensed BHT and to investigate labelling and advertising guidelines. Soon after, the FDA took a number of enforcement actions against several (primarily Internet-based) pharmacies that were producing compounded BHT and in 2008, banned the use of estriol in the US. The FDA stated that it did not take these regulatory actions against compounded bioidentical hormones in response to Wyeth's request, since that is not the purpose of a citizen petition. They said that they had an ongoing investigation when they received the petition. The FDA ordered pharmacies to discontinue use of estriol. The agency's Assistant Director of the Office of Compliance stated that the use of estriol would require a permit for research and a new drug application. The FDA also stated that it has not approved any drug containing estriol and that no information had been submitted to the FDA regarding its safety and effectiveness. The FDA's concerns over the marketing and use of bioidentical hormones were supported by the American Association of Clinical Endocrinologists. In response to the FDA's actions, the International Academy of Compounding Pharmacists began a letter-writing campaign to the FDA to reverse this action, citing Wyeth's attempt as a "self-serving, and at times duplicitous, campaign to restrict patients' access to alternatives to its own products".

In November 2006, the American Medical Association adopted a policy urging the FDA to survey compounded BHT products for purity and dosage; to maintain a registry and require mandatory adverse event reporting by manufacturers and compounding pharmacies related to bioidentical hormones; to mandate the inclusion of uniform patient information, including warnings and precautions regarding bioidentical products; and to prohibit the use of the term bioidentical hormones unless the agency has approved the preparation.

On July 18, 2008, a US Appeals Court issued a ruling stating that new drug approval processes should not be applied to compounded drugs that complied with established guidelines, and also that provisions of the regulations relevant to the use of estriol were still in effect, preventing the FDA from taking action against pharmacies using estriol in compounded products.

== Wiley Protocol ==
The Wiley Protocol is a version of compounded BHT endorsed by T. S. Wiley. Its goal is to produce serum levels of estradiol and progesterone that are identical to those of a young woman with a normal menstrual cycle. It has been criticized for a variety of reasons. Wiley has no academic credentials.

== See also ==
- European Menopause and Andropause Society
- Women's health
