= Ethinylestradiol/gestodene =

Combination drug

- Ethinylestradiol

- Gestodene

Combination of
- Ethinylestradiol: Estrogen
- Gestodene: Progestogen; Progestin

Clinical data
- Trade names: Femodene, Gynera, Harmonet, Lindynette, Logest, Meliane, Minesse, Minulet, Mirelle, others
- Other names: EE/GSD
- Routes of administration: By mouth
- Drug class: Estrogen; Progestin; Progestogen

Legal status
- Legal status: US: ℞-only

Identifiers
- CAS Number: 109852-02-0

Ethinylestradiol/gestodene (EE/GSD), sold under the brand names Femodene and Minulet among others, is a combination of ethinylestradiol (EE), an estrogen, and gestodene (GSD), a progestin, which is used as a birth control pill to prevent pregnancy in women. It is taken by mouth and contains 20 or 30 μg EE and 0.075 mg GSD per tablet. EE/GSD is marketed widely throughout the world.

== See also ==
- List of combined sex-hormonal preparations § Estrogens and progestogens
