= Estradiol/norethisterone =

Combination drug

- Estradiol

- Norethisterone

Combination of
- Estradiol: Estrogen
- Norethisterone: Progestogen; Progestin

Clinical data
- Other names: E2/NET; Netagen; Netagen 403
- Routes of administration: By mouth
- Drug class: Estrogen; Progestin; Progestogen

Legal status
- Legal status: US: ℞-only

Identifiers
- CAS Number: 62057-27-6

Estradiol/norethisterone (E2/NET), tentative brand name Netagen or Netagen 403, was a combination of estradiol (E2), an estrogen, and norethisterone (NET), a progestin, which was studied as a birth control pill to prevent pregnancy in women. It was taken by mouth and contained 4 mg micronized E2 and 3 mg NET per tablet. The medication was developed by Novo Pharmaceuticals in Denmark and was never marketed.

Two related formulations were Netagen 423 (4 mg estradiol, 2 mg estriol, 3 mg norethisterone) and Netasyn (50 μg ethinylestradiol, 3 mg norethisterone), were also studied but never marketed.

== See also ==
- List of combined sex-hormonal preparations § Estrogens and progestogens
- Estradiol-containing birth control pill
