= Ethinylestradiol/desogestrel =

Progestogens and estrogens systemic contraceptives, sequential preparations

Desogestrel/ethinylestradiol
- Ethinylestradiol

- Desogestrel

Combination of
- Ethinylestradiol: Estrogen
- Desogestrel: Progestogen (Progestin)

Clinical data
- Trade names: Marvelon, Desogen, Ortho-cept, others
- Other names: EE/DSG, EE-DSG, DSG+EE
- AHFS/Drugs.com: Professional Drug Facts
- MedlinePlus: a601050
- Routes of administration: By mouth
- ATC code: G03AA09 (WHO)

Legal status
- Legal status: CA: ℞-only; UK: POM (Prescription only); US: ℞-only; EU: Rx-only

Identifiers
- CAS Number: 71138-35-7

Ethinylestradiol/desogestrel (EE/DSG), sold under the brand name Marvelon among others, is a fixed-dose combination of ethinylestradiol (EE), an estrogen, and desogestrel (DSG), a progestin, which is used as a birth control pill to prevent pregnancy in women. It is taken by mouth.

It was approved for medical use in the United Kingdom in 1981, and in the United States in 1992. In 2023, it was the 225th most commonly prescribed medication in the United States, with more than 1 million prescriptions.

== See also ==
- List of combined sex-hormonal preparations § Estrogens and progestogens
