= Nested case–control study =

Epidemiological study design

A nested case–control (NCC) study is a variation of a case–control study in which cases and controls are drawn from the population in a fully enumerated cohort.

Usually, the exposure of interest is only measured among the cases and the selected controls. Thus the nested case–control study is more efficient than the full cohort design. The nested case–control study can be analyzed using methods for missing covariates.

The NCC design is often used when the exposure of interest is difficult or expensive to obtain and when the outcome is rare. By utilizing data previously collected from a large cohort study, the time and cost of beginning a new case–control study is avoided. By only measuring the covariate in as many participants as necessary, the cost and effort of exposure assessment is reduced. This benefit is pronounced when the covariate of interest is biological, since assessments such as gene expression profiling are expensive, and because the quantity of blood available for such analysis is often limited, making it a valuable resource that should not be used unnecessarily.

== Example ==
As an example, of the 91,523 women in the Nurses' Health Study who did not have cancer at baseline and who were followed for 14 years, 2,341 women had developed breast cancer by 1993. Several studies have used standard cohort analyses to study precursors to breast cancer, e.g. use of hormonal contraceptives, which is a covariate easily measured on all of the women in the cohort. However, note that in comparison to the cases, there are so many controls that each particular control contributes relatively little information to the analysis.

If, on the other hand, one is interested in the association between gene expression and breast cancer incidence, it would be very expensive and possibly wasteful of precious blood specimen to assay all 89,000 women without breast cancer. In this situation, one may choose to assay all of the cases, and also, for each case, select a certain number of women to assay from the risk set of participants who have not yet failed (i.e. those who have not developed breast cancer before the particular case in question has developed breast cancer). The risk set is often restricted to those participants who are matched to the case on variables such as age, which reduces the variability of effect estimates.

== Efficiency of the NCC model ==
Commonly 1–4 controls are selected for each case. Since the covariate is not measured for all participants, the nested case–control model is both less expensive than a full cohort analysis and more efficient than taking a simple random sample from the full cohort. However, it has been shown that with 4 controls per case and/or stratified sampling of controls, relatively little efficiency may be lost, depending on the method of estimation used.

== Analysis of nested case–control studies ==
The analysis of a nested case–control model must take into account the way in which controls are sampled from the cohort. Failing to do so, such as by treating the cases and selected controls as the original cohort and performing a logistic regression, which is common, can result in biased estimates whose null distribution is different from what is assumed. Ways to account for the random sampling include conditional logistic regression, and using inverse probability weighting to adjust for missing covariates among those who are not selected into the study.

== Case–cohort study ==
A case–cohort study is a design in which cases and controls are drawn from within a prospective study. All cases who developed the outcome of interest during the follow-up are selected and compared with a random sample of the cohort. This randomly selected control sample could, by chance, include some cases. Exposure is defined prior to disease development based on data collected at baseline or on assays conducted in biological samples collected at baseline.
