= Ethinylestradiol/levonorgestrel =

Pharmaceutical combination

Combination of
- Ethinylestradiol: Estrogen
- Levonorgestrel: Progestogen

Clinical data
- Trade names: Altavera, Alysena, Amethyst, others
- Other names: EE/LNG
- AHFS/Drugs.com: Monograph
- MedlinePlus: a601050
- Routes of administration: By mouth
- ATC code: G03AA07 (WHO)

Legal status
- Legal status: CA: ℞-only; US: ℞-only

Identifiers
- CAS Number: 39366-37-5
- KEGG: D04482

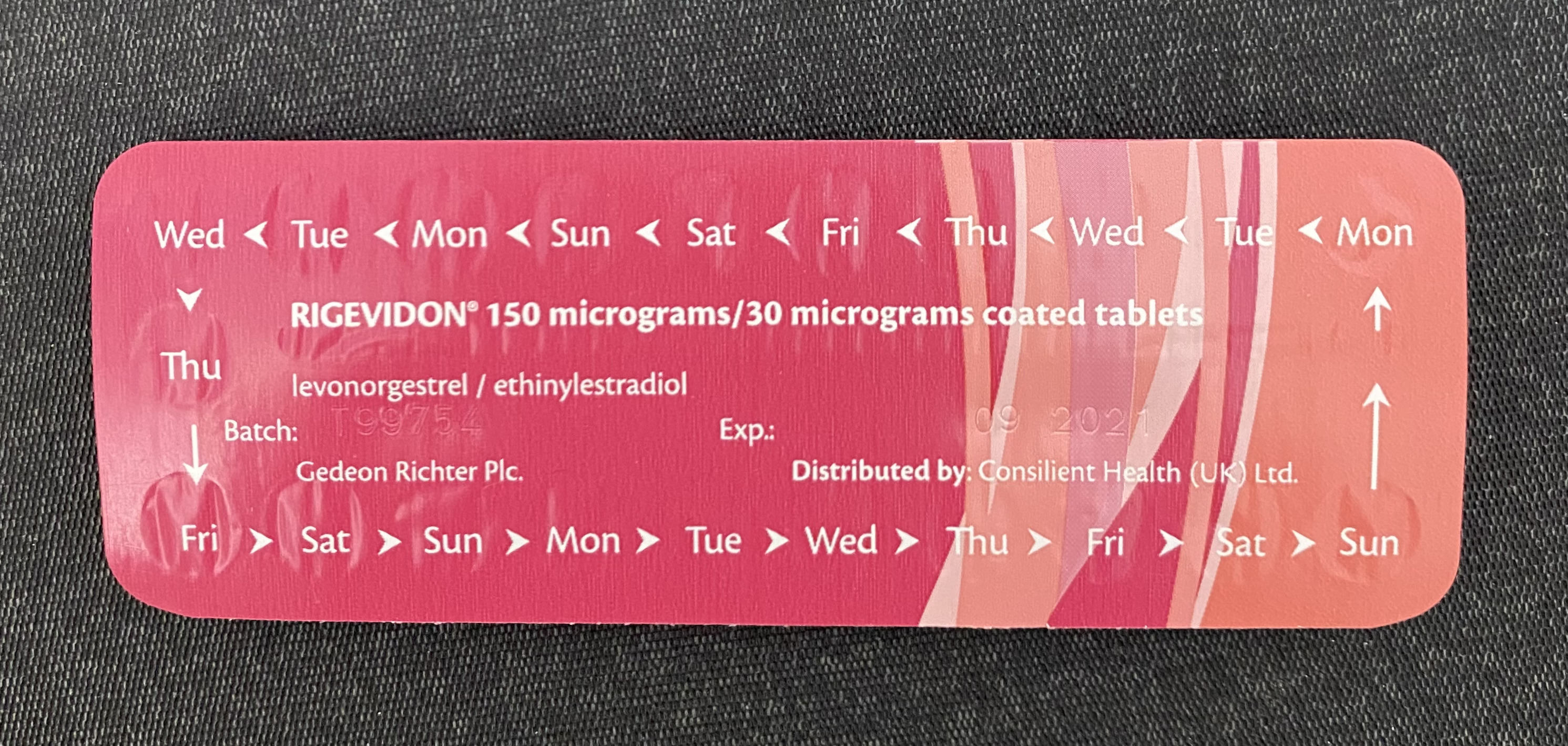
Rigevidon, an example of a combined ethinylestradiol/levonorgestrel contraceptive pill

Ethinylestradiol/levonorgestrel (EE/LNG) is a combined birth control pill made up of ethinylestradiol (an estrogen) and levonorgestrel (a progestin). It is used for birth control, symptoms of menstruation, endometriosis, and as emergency contraception. It is taken by mouth. Some preparations of EE/LNG additionally contain an iron supplement in the form of ferrous bisglycinate or ferrous fumarate.

Side effects can include nausea, headache, blood clots, breast pain, depression, and liver problems. Use is not recommended during pregnancy, the initial three weeks after childbirth, and in those at high risk of blood clots. However, it may be started immediately after a miscarriage or abortion. Smoking while using combined birth control pills is not recommended. It works by stopping ovulation, making the mucus at the opening to the cervix thick, and making the uterus not suitable for implantation.

Ethinylestradiol/levonorgestrel has been approved for medical use in the United States since 1982. It is on the World Health Organization's List of Essential Medicines. It is available as a generic medication. It is marketed under many brand names. In 2023, it was the 138th most commonly prescribed medication in the United States, with more than 4 million prescriptions.

== See also ==
- Birth control pill formulations
- List of combined sex-hormonal preparations
