= Estradiol/dydrogesterone =

Combination drug

- Estradiol

- Dydrogesterone

Combination of
- Estradiol: Estrogen
- Dydrogesterone: Progestogen; Progestin

Clinical data
- Trade names: Femoston, Climaston, Femaston
- Other names: E2/DYD
- Routes of administration: By mouth
- Drug class: Estrogen; Progestin; Progestogen

Legal status
- Legal status: AU: S4 (Prescription only); UK: POM (Prescription only); US: ℞-only

Identifiers
- CAS Number: 189038-72-0

Estradiol/dydrogesterone (E2/DYD), sold under the brand name Femoston among others, is a combination of estradiol (E2), an estrogen, and dydrogesterone (DYD), a progestin, which is used in menopausal hormone therapy, specifically to treat and prevent hot flashes and osteoporosis, in postmenopausal women. It is taken by mouth and contains 0.5, 1, or 2 mg E2 and 2.5, 5, 10, or 20 mg DYD per tablet. The medication is marketed widely throughout the world. It is not available in the United States or Canada.

== See also ==
- List of combined sex-hormonal preparations § Estrogens and progestogens
