= Estradiol/levonorgestrel =

Combination drug

Combination of
- Estradiol: Estrogen
- Levonorgestrel: Progestogen

Clinical data
- Trade names: Climara Pro
- Other names: E2/LNG
- License data: US DailyMed: Estradiol and levonorgestrel
- ATC code: G03FA01 (WHO)

Legal status
- Legal status: US: ℞-only

Identifiers
- CAS Number: 77728-33-7

Estradiol/levonorgestrel, sold under brand name Climara Pro, is a combination of estradiol (E2) and levonorgestrel (LNG) which is used in menopausal hormone therapy. It is a 22-cm^{2} transdermal patch containing 4.4 mg estradiol and 1.39 mg levonorgestrel and delivers 45 μg/day estradiol and 15 μg/day levonorgestrel. E2/LNG was approved for medical use in the United States in 2003.

The most common adverse reactions include application site reaction, vaginal bleeding, breast pain, upper respiratory infection, back pain, depression, pain, headache and flu syndrome.

It is available as a generic medication.

== Medical uses ==
Estradiol/levonorgestrel is indicated in a woman with a uterus for the treatment of moderate to severe vasomotor symptoms due to menopause; or the prevention of postmenopausal osteoporosis.

== See also ==
- List of combined sex-hormonal preparations
