= Ethinylestradiol/norethisterone =

Pharmaceutical combination

Combination of
- Ethinylestradiol: Estrogen
- Norethisterone: Progestogen

Clinical data
- Trade names: Alyacen, Aranelle, Balziva, others
- Other names: EE/NET
- AHFS/Drugs.com: Monograph
- MedlinePlus: a601050
- License data: US DailyMed: Norethindrone and ethinyl estradiol
- Routes of administration: By mouth
- ATC code: G03AA05 (WHO)

Legal status
- Legal status: US: ℞-only

Identifiers
- CAS Number: 37270-71-6
- PubChem CID: 62925
- ChemSpider: None
- CompTox Dashboard (EPA): DTXSID00958416

Ethinylestradiol/norethisterone (EE/NET), or ethinylestradiol/norethindrone, is a combination birth control pill which contains ethinylestradiol (EE), an estrogen and norethisterone (NET), a progestin. It is used for birth control, symptoms of menstruation, endometriosis, and menopausal symptoms. Other uses include acne. It is taken by mouth. Some preparations of EE/NET additionally contain an iron supplement in the form of ferrous fumarate.

Side effects can include nausea, headache, blood clots, breast pain, depression, and liver problems. Use is not recommended during pregnancy, the initial three weeks after childbirth, and in those at high risk of blood clots. It, however, may be started immediately after a miscarriage or abortion. Smoking while using combined birth control pills is not recommended. It works by stopping ovulation, making the uterus not suitable for implantation, and making the mucus at the opening to the cervix thick.

This combination pill was approved for medical use in the United States in 1964. It is on the World Health Organization's List of Essential Medicines. It is available as a generic medication. It is marketed under a large number of brand names. In 2023, the combination of ethinylestradiol with norethisterone or with norethisterone acetate was the 79th most commonly prescribed medication in the United States, with more than 8 million prescriptions.

== See also ==
- Oral contraceptive formulations
- List of combined sex-hormonal preparations
