= Estrone (medication) =

Estrogen medication

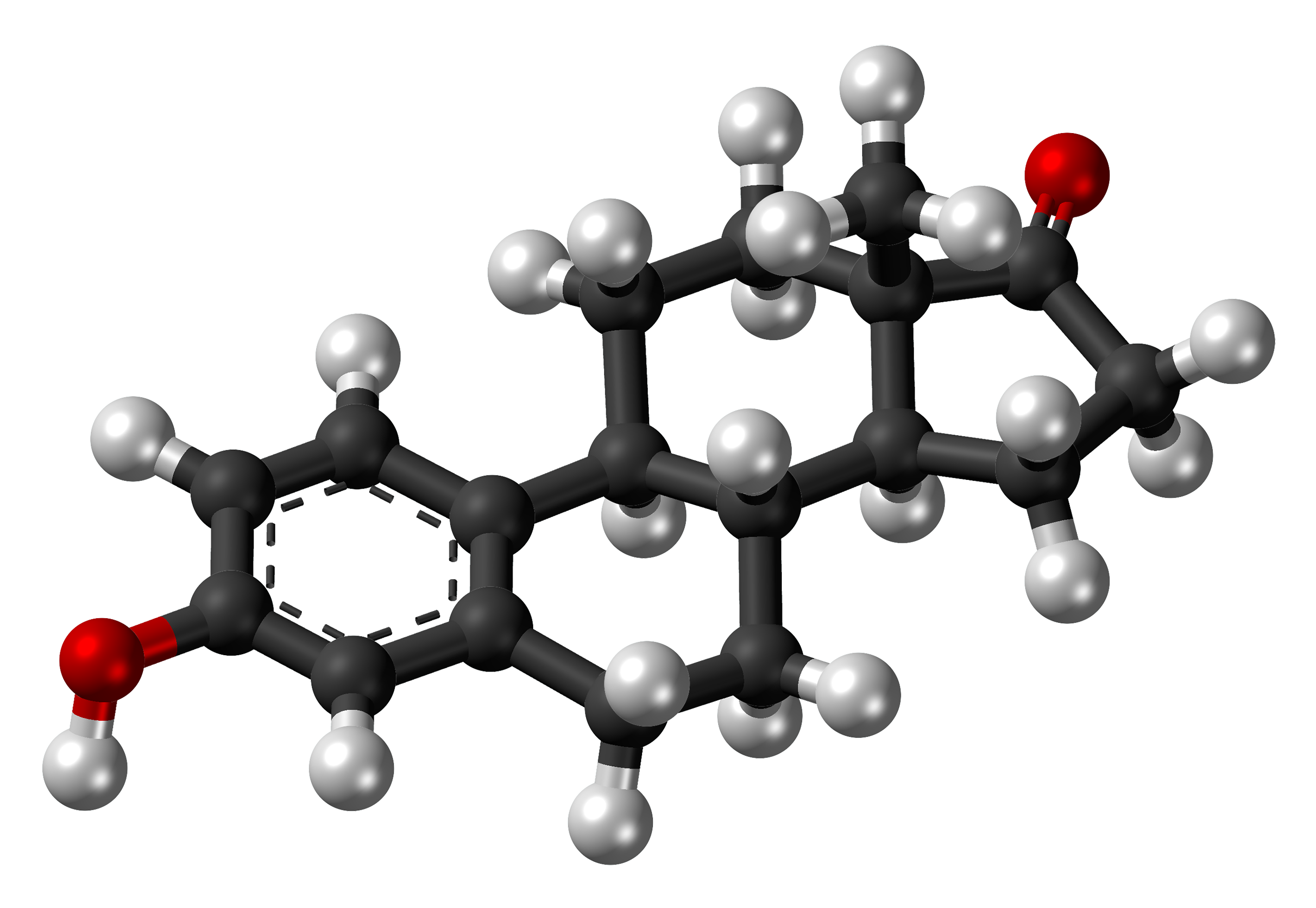

Clinical data
- Trade names: Estragyn, Kestrin, Theelin, many others
- Other names: Oestrone; E1; Follicular hormone; Folliculin; Folliculine; Follikulin; Theelin; Ketohydroxyestrin; Oxohydroxyestrin; 3-Hydroxyestra-1,3,5(10)-trien-17-one
- Routes of administration: Intramuscular injection, vaginal, by mouth (as E2/E1/E3 or as estrone sulfate)
- Drug class: Estrogen
- ATC code: G03CA07 (WHO) G03CC04 (WHO)

Legal status
- Legal status: US: ℞-only

Pharmacokinetic data
- Bioavailability: Oral: very low
- Protein binding: 96.0–98.0%: • Albumin: ~80% • SHBG: ~16% • Free: 2.0–4.0%
- Metabolism: Liver (via hydroxylation, sulfation, glucuronidation)
- Metabolites: • Estradiol • Estrone sulfate • Estrone glucuronide • Others
- Elimination half-life: IV: 20–30 minutes
- Excretion: Urine

Identifiers
- IUPAC name: (8R,9S,13S,14S)-3-hydroxy-13-methyl-7,8,9,11,12,14,15,16-octahydro-6H-cyclopenta[a]phenanthren-17-one
- CAS Number: 53-16-7
- PubChem CID: 5870
- IUPHAR/BPS: 2818
- DrugBank: DB00655
- ChemSpider: 5660
- UNII: 2DI9HA706A
- KEGG: D00067
- ChEBI: CHEBI:17263
- ChEMBL: ChEMBL1405

Chemical and physical data
- Formula: C_{18}H_{22}O_{2}
- Molar mass: 270.372 g·mol^{−1}
- 3D model (JSmol): Interactive image
- Melting point: 254.5 °C (490.1 °F)
- SMILES: Oc1ccc2[C@H]3CC[C@]4(C)C(CC[C@H]4[C@@H]3CCc2c1)=O
- InChI: InChI=1S/C18H22O2/c1-18-9-8-14-13-5-3-12(19)10-11(13)2-4-15(14)16(18)6-7-17(18)20/h3,5,10,14-16,19H,2,4,6-9H2,1H3/t14-,15-,16+,18+/m1/s1; Key:DNXHEGUUPJUMQT-CBZIJGRNSA-N

Estrone (E1), sold under the brand names Estragyn, Kestrin, and Theelin among many others, is an estrogen medication and naturally occurring steroid hormone which has been used in menopausal hormone therapy and for other indications. It has been provided as an aqueous suspension or oil solution given by injection into muscle and as a vaginal cream applied inside of the vagina. It can also be taken by mouth as estradiol/estrone/estriol (brand name Hormonin) and in the form of prodrugs like estropipate (estrone sulfate; brand name Ogen) and conjugated estrogens (mostly estrone sulfate; brand name Premarin).

Side effects of estrogens like estrone include breast tenderness, breast enlargement, headache, nausea, fluid retention, and edema, among others. Estrone is a naturally occurring and bioidentical estrogen, or an agonist of the estrogen receptor, the biological target of estrogens like endogenous estradiol. It is a relatively weak estrogen, with much lower activity than estradiol. However, estrone is converted in the body into estradiol, which provides most or all of its estrogenic potency. As such, estrone is a prodrug of estradiol.

Estrone was first discovered in 1929, and was introduced for medical use shortly thereafter. Although it has been used clinically in the past, estrone has largely been discontinued and is mostly no longer marketed.

== Medical uses ==
Estrone has been marketed in intramuscular and vaginal formulations and was used as an estrogen in the treatment of symptoms of low estrogen levels such as hot flashes and vaginal atrophy in postmenopausal or ovariectomized women. Estrone has also been used as an antigonadotropin and form of high-dose estrogen to treat prostate cancer in men as well as a form of high-dose estrogen to treat breast cancer in women. It has since largely been discontinued and is mostly no longer available, having been superseded by other estrogens with better potency and pharmacokinetics (namely oral bioavailability and duration).

Regardless of route of administration, if estrone is taken by a woman with an intact uterus, it should be combined with a progestogen such as progesterone to offset the risk of endometrial hyperplasia and cancer.

Estrone has been used by intramuscular injection at a dosage of 0.1 to 2 mg per week, or 0.1 to 0.5 mg given 2 or 3 times per week, for the treatment of menopausal symptoms such as hot flashes and vaginal atrophy, and at a dosage of 0.1 to 1.0 mg weekly in single or divided doses for the treatment of female hypogonadism, surgical castration, and primary ovarian failure. The range of single doses of estrone by intramuscular injection that are typically used clinically in women is 0.1 to 5 mg. High doses of intramuscular estrone have been used for prostate cancer in men and for breast cancer in women.

=== Available forms ===
Estrone for intramuscular injection was provided as 1, 2, 2.5, 3, 4, and 5 mg/mL aqueous suspensions and/or oil solutions. It has also been available in the form of vaginal creams (1 mg/g (0.1%)) and suppositories (0.2 mg, 0.25 mg) as well as subcutaneous pellet implants and oral tablets (1.25 mg). A combined oral tablet formulation containing estradiol (0.3 mg, 0.6 mg), estrone (0.7 mg, 1.4 mg), and estriol (0.135 mg, 0.27 mg) has been marketed under the brand name Hormonin as well. In addition, a combined injectable preparation containing estrone (1 mg) and progesterone (10 mg) is available in the form of ampoules under the brand name Synergon.

Although estrone by intramuscular injection was originally formulated as an oil solution, it was soon replaced by formulations of estrone as an aqueous suspension due to a longer duration of action of these formulations.

== Side effects ==
Side effects of estrogens like estrone include breast tenderness, breast enlargement, headache, nausea, fluid retention, and edema, among others. It can also cause endometrial hyperplasia.

== Pharmacology ==
=== Pharmacodynamics ===
==== Mechanism of action ====
Estrone is an estrogen, specifically an agonist of the estrogen receptors (ERs) ERα and ERβ. It is a far less potent estrogen than is estradiol, and as such is a relatively weak estrogen. Given by subcutaneous injection in mice, estradiol is about 10-fold more potent than estrone and about 100-fold more potent than estriol. According to one study, the relative binding affinities of estrone for the human ERα and ERβ were 4.0% and 3.5% of those estradiol, respectively, and the relative transactivational capacities of estrone at the ERα and ERβ were 2.6% and 4.3% of those of estradiol, respectively. In accordance, the estrogenic activity of estrone has been reported to be approximately 4% of that of estradiol. Other studies have reported that estrone has about one-tenth of the potency of estradiol in activating the ERs in vitro. Because estrone can be transformed into estradiol, which is far more potent as an estrogen in comparison, most or all of the estrogenic potency of estrone in vivo is actually due to conversion into estradiol. As such, similarly to the case of estrone sulfate, estrone is considered to be a prodrug of estradiol. Some in vitro research has suggested that estrone might be able to partially antagonize the actions of estradiol, but this does not appear to be of clinical significance. In contrast to estradiol and estriol, estrone is not a ligand of the G protein-coupled estrogen receptor (affinity >10,000 nM).

Affinities of estrogen receptor ligands for the ERα and ERβ
Ligand	Other names	Relative binding affinities (RBA, %)^{a}		Absolute binding affinities (K_{i}, nM)^{a}		Action
Ligand	Other names	ERα	ERβ	ERα	ERβ	Action
Estradiol	E2; 17β-Estradiol	100	100	0.115 (0.04–0.24)	0.15 (0.10–2.08)	Estrogen
Estrone	E1; 17-Ketoestradiol	16.39 (0.7–60)	6.5 (1.36–52)	0.445 (0.3–1.01)	1.75 (0.35–9.24)	Estrogen
Estriol	E3; 16α-OH-17β-E2	12.65 (4.03–56)	26 (14.0–44.6)	0.45 (0.35–1.4)	0.7 (0.63–0.7)	Estrogen
Estetrol	E4; 15α,16α-Di-OH-17β-E2	4.0	3.0	4.9	19	Estrogen
Alfatradiol	17α-Estradiol	20.5 (7–80.1)	8.195 (2–42)	0.2–0.52	0.43–1.2	Metabolite
16-Epiestriol	16β-Hydroxy-17β-estradiol	7.795 (4.94–63)	50	?	?	Metabolite
17-Epiestriol	16α-Hydroxy-17α-estradiol	55.45 (29–103)	79–80	?	?	Metabolite
16,17-Epiestriol	16β-Hydroxy-17α-estradiol	1.0	13	?	?	Metabolite
2-Hydroxyestradiol	2-OH-E2	22 (7–81)	11–35	2.5	1.3	Metabolite
2-Methoxyestradiol	2-MeO-E2	0.0027–2.0	1.0	?	?	Metabolite
4-Hydroxyestradiol	4-OH-E2	13 (8–70)	7–56	1.0	1.9	Metabolite
4-Methoxyestradiol	4-MeO-E2	2.0	1.0	?	?	Metabolite
2-Hydroxyestrone	2-OH-E1	2.0–4.0	0.2–0.4	?	?	Metabolite
2-Methoxyestrone	2-MeO-E1	<0.001–<1	<1	?	?	Metabolite
4-Hydroxyestrone	4-OH-E1	1.0–2.0	1.0	?	?	Metabolite
4-Methoxyestrone	4-MeO-E1	<1	<1	?	?	Metabolite
16α-Hydroxyestrone	16α-OH-E1; 17-Ketoestriol	2.0–6.5	35	?	?	Metabolite
2-Hydroxyestriol	2-OH-E3	2.0	1.0	?	?	Metabolite
4-Methoxyestriol	4-MeO-E3	1.0	1.0	?	?	Metabolite
Estradiol sulfate	E2S; Estradiol 3-sulfate	<1	<1	?	?	Metabolite
Estradiol disulfate	Estradiol 3,17β-disulfate	0.0004	?	?	?	Metabolite
Estradiol 3-glucuronide	E2-3G	0.0079	?	?	?	Metabolite
Estradiol 17β-glucuronide	E2-17G	0.0015	?	?	?	Metabolite
Estradiol 3-gluc. 17β-sulfate	E2-3G-17S	0.0001	?	?	?	Metabolite
Estrone sulfate	E1S; Estrone 3-sulfate	<1	<1	>10	>10	Metabolite
Estradiol benzoate	EB; Estradiol 3-benzoate	10	?	?	?	Estrogen
Estradiol 17β-benzoate	E2-17B	11.3	32.6	?	?	Estrogen
Estrone methyl ether	Estrone 3-methyl ether	0.145	?	?	?	Estrogen
ent-Estradiol	1-Estradiol	1.31–12.34	9.44–80.07	?	?	Estrogen
Equilin	7-Dehydroestrone	13 (4.0–28.9)	13.0–49	0.79	0.36	Estrogen
Equilenin	6,8-Didehydroestrone	2.0–15	7.0–20	0.64	0.62	Estrogen
17β-Dihydroequilin	7-Dehydro-17β-estradiol	7.9–113	7.9–108	0.09	0.17	Estrogen
17α-Dihydroequilin	7-Dehydro-17α-estradiol	18.6 (18–41)	14–32	0.24	0.57	Estrogen
17β-Dihydroequilenin	6,8-Didehydro-17β-estradiol	35–68	90–100	0.15	0.20	Estrogen
17α-Dihydroequilenin	6,8-Didehydro-17α-estradiol	20	49	0.50	0.37	Estrogen
Δ^{8}-Estradiol	8,9-Dehydro-17β-estradiol	68	72	0.15	0.25	Estrogen
Δ^{8}-Estrone	8,9-Dehydroestrone	19	32	0.52	0.57	Estrogen
Ethinylestradiol	EE; 17α-Ethynyl-17β-E2	120.9 (68.8–480)	44.4 (2.0–144)	0.02–0.05	0.29–0.81	Estrogen
Mestranol	EE 3-methyl ether	?	2.5	?	?	Estrogen
Moxestrol	RU-2858; 11β-Methoxy-EE	35–43	5–20	0.5	2.6	Estrogen
Methylestradiol	17α-Methyl-17β-estradiol	70	44	?	?	Estrogen
Diethylstilbestrol	DES; Stilbestrol	129.5 (89.1–468)	219.63 (61.2–295)	0.04	0.05	Estrogen
Hexestrol	Dihydrodiethylstilbestrol	153.6 (31–302)	60–234	0.06	0.06	Estrogen
Dienestrol	Dehydrostilbestrol	37 (20.4–223)	56–404	0.05	0.03	Estrogen
Benzestrol (B2)	–	114	?	?	?	Estrogen
Chlorotrianisene	TACE	1.74	?	15.30	?	Estrogen
Triphenylethylene	TPE	0.074	?	?	?	Estrogen
Triphenylbromoethylene	TPBE	2.69	?	?	?	Estrogen
Tamoxifen	ICI-46,474	3 (0.1–47)	3.33 (0.28–6)	3.4–9.69	2.5	SERM
Afimoxifene	4-Hydroxytamoxifen; 4-OHT	100.1 (1.7–257)	10 (0.98–339)	2.3 (0.1–3.61)	0.04–4.8	SERM
Toremifene	4-Chlorotamoxifen; 4-CT	?	?	7.14–20.3	15.4	SERM
Clomifene	MRL-41	25 (19.2–37.2)	12	0.9	1.2	SERM
Cyclofenil	F-6066; Sexovid	151–152	243	?	?	SERM
Nafoxidine	U-11,000A	30.9–44	16	0.3	0.8	SERM
Raloxifene	–	41.2 (7.8–69)	5.34 (0.54–16)	0.188–0.52	20.2	SERM
Arzoxifene	LY-353,381	?	?	0.179	?	SERM
Lasofoxifene	CP-336,156	10.2–166	19.0	0.229	?	SERM
Ormeloxifene	Centchroman	?	?	0.313	?	SERM
Levormeloxifene	6720-CDRI; NNC-460,020	1.55	1.88	?	?	SERM
Ospemifene	Deaminohydroxytoremifene	0.82–2.63	0.59–1.22	?	?	SERM
Bazedoxifene	–	?	?	0.053	?	SERM
Etacstil	GW-5638	4.30	11.5	?	?	SERM
ICI-164,384	–	63.5 (3.70–97.7)	166	0.2	0.08	Antiestrogen
Fulvestrant	ICI-182,780	43.5 (9.4–325)	21.65 (2.05–40.5)	0.42	1.3	Antiestrogen
Propylpyrazoletriol	PPT	49 (10.0–89.1)	0.12	0.40	92.8	ERα agonist
16α-LE2	16α-Lactone-17β-estradiol	14.6–57	0.089	0.27	131	ERα agonist
16α-Iodo-E2	16α-Iodo-17β-estradiol	30.2	2.30	?	?	ERα agonist
Methylpiperidinopyrazole	MPP	11	0.05	?	?	ERα antagonist
Diarylpropionitrile	DPN	0.12–0.25	6.6–18	32.4	1.7	ERβ agonist
8β-VE2	8β-Vinyl-17β-estradiol	0.35	22.0–83	12.9	0.50	ERβ agonist
Prinaberel	ERB-041; WAY-202,041	0.27	67–72	?	?	ERβ agonist
ERB-196	WAY-202,196	?	180	?	?	ERβ agonist
Erteberel	SERBA-1; LY-500,307	?	?	2.68	0.19	ERβ agonist
SERBA-2	–	?	?	14.5	1.54	ERβ agonist
Coumestrol	–	9.225 (0.0117–94)	64.125 (0.41–185)	0.14–80.0	0.07–27.0	Xenoestrogen
Genistein	–	0.445 (0.0012–16)	33.42 (0.86–87)	2.6–126	0.3–12.8	Xenoestrogen
Equol	–	0.2–0.287	0.85 (0.10–2.85)	?	?	Xenoestrogen
Daidzein	–	0.07 (0.0018–9.3)	0.7865 (0.04–17.1)	2.0	85.3	Xenoestrogen
Biochanin A	–	0.04 (0.022–0.15)	0.6225 (0.010–1.2)	174	8.9	Xenoestrogen
Kaempferol	–	0.07 (0.029–0.10)	2.2 (0.002–3.00)	?	?	Xenoestrogen
Naringenin	–	0.0054 (<0.001–0.01)	0.15 (0.11–0.33)	?	?	Xenoestrogen
8-Prenylnaringenin	8-PN	4.4	?	?	?	Xenoestrogen
Quercetin	–	<0.001–0.01	0.002–0.040	?	?	Xenoestrogen
Ipriflavone	–	<0.01	<0.01	?	?	Xenoestrogen
Miroestrol	–	0.39	?	?	?	Xenoestrogen
Deoxymiroestrol	–	2.0	?	?	?	Xenoestrogen
β-Sitosterol	–	<0.001–0.0875	<0.001–0.016	?	?	Xenoestrogen
Resveratrol	–	<0.001–0.0032	?	?	?	Xenoestrogen
α-Zearalenol	–	48 (13–52.5)	?	?	?	Xenoestrogen
β-Zearalenol	–	0.6 (0.032–13)	?	?	?	Xenoestrogen
Zeranol	α-Zearalanol	48–111	?	?	?	Xenoestrogen
Taleranol	β-Zearalanol	16 (13–17.8)	14	0.8	0.9	Xenoestrogen
Zearalenone	ZEN	7.68 (2.04–28)	9.45 (2.43–31.5)	?	?	Xenoestrogen
Zearalanone	ZAN	0.51	?	?	?	Xenoestrogen
Bisphenol A	BPA	0.0315 (0.008–1.0)	0.135 (0.002–4.23)	195	35	Xenoestrogen
Endosulfan	EDS	<0.001–<0.01	<0.01	?	?	Xenoestrogen
Kepone	Chlordecone	0.0069–0.2	?	?	?	Xenoestrogen
o,p'-DDT	–	0.0073–0.4	?	?	?	Xenoestrogen
p,p'-DDT	–	0.03	?	?	?	Xenoestrogen
Methoxychlor	p,p'-Dimethoxy-DDT	0.01 (<0.001–0.02)	0.01–0.13	?	?	Xenoestrogen
HPTE	Hydroxychlor; p,p'-OH-DDT	1.2–1.7	?	?	?	Xenoestrogen
Testosterone	T; 4-Androstenolone	<0.0001–<0.01	<0.002–0.040	>5000	>5000	Androgen
Dihydrotestosterone	DHT; 5α-Androstanolone	0.01 (<0.001–0.05)	0.0059–0.17	221–>5000	73–1688	Androgen
Nandrolone	19-Nortestosterone; 19-NT	0.01	0.23	765	53	Androgen
Dehydroepiandrosterone	DHEA; Prasterone	0.038 (<0.001–0.04)	0.019–0.07	245–1053	163–515	Androgen
5-Androstenediol	A5; Androstenediol	6	17	3.6	0.9	Androgen
4-Androstenediol	–	0.5	0.6	23	19	Androgen
4-Androstenedione	A4; Androstenedione	<0.01	<0.01	>10000	>10000	Androgen
3α-Androstanediol	3α-Adiol	0.07	0.3	260	48	Androgen
3β-Androstanediol	3β-Adiol	3	7	6	2	Androgen
Androstanedione	5α-Androstanedione	<0.01	<0.01	>10000	>10000	Androgen
Etiocholanedione	5β-Androstanedione	<0.01	<0.01	>10000	>10000	Androgen
Methyltestosterone	17α-Methyltestosterone	<0.0001	?	?	?	Androgen
Ethinyl-3α-androstanediol	17α-Ethynyl-3α-adiol	4.0	<0.07	?	?	Estrogen
Ethinyl-3β-androstanediol	17α-Ethynyl-3β-adiol	50	5.6	?	?	Estrogen
Progesterone	P4; 4-Pregnenedione	<0.001–0.6	<0.001–0.010	?	?	Progestogen
Norethisterone	NET; 17α-Ethynyl-19-NT	0.085 (0.0015–<0.1)	0.1 (0.01–0.3)	152	1084	Progestogen
Norethynodrel	5(10)-Norethisterone	0.5 (0.3–0.7)	<0.1–0.22	14	53	Progestogen
Tibolone	7α-Methylnorethynodrel	0.5 (0.45–2.0)	0.2–0.076	?	?	Progestogen
Δ^{4}-Tibolone	7α-Methylnorethisterone	0.069–<0.1	0.027–<0.1	?	?	Progestogen
3α-Hydroxytibolone	–	2.5 (1.06–5.0)	0.6–0.8	?	?	Progestogen
3β-Hydroxytibolone	–	1.6 (0.75–1.9)	0.070–0.1	?	?	Progestogen
Footnotes: ^{a} = (1) Binding affinity values are of the format "median (range)" (# (#–#)), "range" (#–#), or "value" (#) depending on the values available. The full sets of values within the ranges can be found in the Wiki code. (2) Binding affinities were determined via displacement studies in a variety of in-vitro systems with labeled estradiol and human ERα and ERβ proteins (except the ERβ values from Kuiper et al. (1997), which are rat ERβ). Sources: See template page.

Relative affinities of estrogens for steroid hormone receptors and blood proteins
Estrogen	Relative binding affinities (%)						
Estrogen	ER	AR	PR	GR	MR	SHBG	CBG
Estradiol	100	7.9	2.6	0.6	0.13	8.7–12	<0.1
Estradiol benzoate	?	?	?	?	?	<0.1–0.16	<0.1
Estradiol valerate	2	?	?	?	?	?	?
Estrone	11–35	<1	<1	<1	<1	2.7	<0.1
Estrone sulfate	2	2	?	?	?	?	?
Estriol	10–15	<1	<1	<1	<1	<0.1	<0.1
Equilin	40	?	?	?	?	?	0
Alfatradiol	15	<1	<1	<1	<1	?	?
Epiestriol	20	<1	<1	<1	<1	?	?
Ethinylestradiol	100–112	1–3	15–25	1–3	<1	0.18	<0.1
Mestranol	1	?	?	?	?	<0.1	<0.1
Methylestradiol	67	1–3	3–25	1–3	<1	?	?
Moxestrol	12	<0.1	0.8	3.2	<0.1	<0.2	<0.1
Diethylstilbestrol	?	?	?	?	?	<0.1	<0.1
Notes: Reference ligands (100%) were progesterone for the PR, testosterone for the AR, estradiol for the ER, dexamethasone for the GR, aldosterone for the MR, dihydrotestosterone for SHBG, and cortisol for CBG. Sources: See template.

Selected biological properties of endogenous estrogens in rats
Estrogen	ER RBA (%)	Uterine weight (%)	Uterotrophy	LH levels (%)	SHBG RBA (%)
Control	–	100	–	100	–
Estradiol (E2)	100	506 ± 20	+++	12–19	100
Estrone (E1)	11 ± 8	490 ± 22	+++	?	20
Estriol (E3)	10 ± 4	468 ± 30	+++	8–18	3
Estetrol (E4)	0.5 ± 0.2	?	Inactive	?	1
17α-Estradiol	4.2 ± 0.8	?	?	?	?
2-Hydroxyestradiol	24 ± 7	285 ± 8	+^{b}	31–61	28
2-Methoxyestradiol	0.05 ± 0.04	101	Inactive	?	130
4-Hydroxyestradiol	45 ± 12	?	?	?	?
4-Methoxyestradiol	1.3 ± 0.2	260	++	?	9
4-Fluoroestradiol^{a}	180 ± 43	?	+++	?	?
2-Hydroxyestrone	1.9 ± 0.8	130 ± 9	Inactive	110–142	8
2-Methoxyestrone	0.01 ± 0.00	103 ± 7	Inactive	95–100	120
4-Hydroxyestrone	11 ± 4	351	++	21–50	35
4-Methoxyestrone	0.13 ± 0.04	338	++	65–92	12
16α-Hydroxyestrone	2.8 ± 1.0	552 ± 42	+++	7–24	<0.5
2-Hydroxyestriol	0.9 ± 0.3	302	+^{b}	?	?
2-Methoxyestriol	0.01 ± 0.00	?	Inactive	?	4
Notes: Values are mean ± SD or range. ER RBA = Relative binding affinity to estrogen receptors of rat uterine cytosol. Uterine weight = Percentage change in uterine wet weight of ovariectomized rats after 72 hours with continuous administration of 1 μg/hour via subcutaneously implanted osmotic pumps. LH levels = Luteinizing hormone levels relative to baseline of ovariectomized rats after 24 to 72 hours of continuous administration via subcutaneous implant. Footnotes: ^{a} = Synthetic (i.e., not endogenous). ^{b} = Atypical uterotrophic effect which plateaus within 48 hours (estradiol's uterotrophy continues linearly up to 72 hours). Sources:

==== Effects in the body and brain ====
In clinical research in the 1930s, estrone was given via intramuscular injection to ovariectomized women in order to study its effects and to elucidate the biological properties of estrogens in humans. In these studies, prior to administration of estrone, amenorrhea, atrophy of the breasts (as well as flaccidity and small and non-erectile nipples), vagina, and endometrium, vaginal dryness, and subjective symptoms of ovariectomy (e.g., hot flashes, mood changes) were all present in the women. Treatment with estrone was found to dose- and time-dependently produce a variety of effects, including breast changes, reproductive tract changes of the vagina, cervix, and endometrium/uterus, and relief from the subjective symptoms of ovariectomy, as well as increased libido. Breast changes specifically included enlargement and a sense of fullness, increased sensitivity and pigmentation of the nipples as well as nipple erection, tingling within the breast mammary glandular tissue, and aching and soreness of the breasts. Reproductive tract changes included increased growth, thickness, and differentiation of the endometrium, and reversal of vaginal and cervical atrophy, which were accompanied by increased congestion of the cervix and mucous discharge from the cervix, uterine cramps and needle-like pains, pelvic fullness, a "bearing-down" sensation, and increased vaginal lubrication, as well as uterine bleeding both during treatment and in the days following cessation of injections. Endometrial hyperplasia also occurred with sufficiently high doses of estrone.

Clinical research has confirmed the nature of estrone as an inactive prodrug of estradiol. With oral administration of estradiol, the ratio of estradiol levels to estrone levels is about 5 times higher on average than under normal physiological circumstances in premenopausal women and with parenteral (non-oral) routes of estradiol. Oral administration of menopausal replacement dosages of estradiol results in low, follicular phase levels of estradiol, whereas estrone levels resemble the high levels seen during the first trimester of pregnancy. In spite of markedly elevated levels of estrone with oral estradiol but not with transdermal estradiol, clinical studies have shown that doses of oral and transdermal estradiol achieving similar levels of estradiol possess equivalent and non-significantly different potency in terms of measures including suppression of luteinizing hormone and follicle-stimulating hormone levels, inhibition of bone resorption, and relief of menopausal symptoms such as hot flashes. In addition, estradiol levels were found to correlate with these effects, while estrone levels did not. These findings confirm that estrone has very low estrogenic activity, and also indicate that estrone does not diminish the estrogenic activity of estradiol. This contradicts some cell-free in-vitro research suggesting that high concentrations of estrone might be able to partially antagonize the actions of estradiol.

Relative oral potencies of estrogens
Estrogen	HF	VE	UCa	FSH	LH	HDL-C	SHBG	CBG	AGT	Liver
Estradiol	1.0	1.0	1.0	1.0	1.0	1.0	1.0	1.0	1.0	1.0
Estrone	?	?	?	0.3	0.3	?	?	?	?	?
Estriol	0.3	0.3	0.1	0.3	0.3	0.2	?	?	?	0.67
Estrone sulfate	?	0.9	0.9	0.8–0.9	0.9	0.5	0.9	0.5–0.7	1.4–1.5	0.56–1.7
Conjugated estrogens	1.2	1.5	2.0	1.1–1.3	1.0	1.5	3.0–3.2	1.3–1.5	5.0	1.3–4.5
Equilin sulfate	?	?	1.0	?	?	6.0	7.5	6.0	7.5	?
Ethinylestradiol	120	150	400	60–150	100	400	500–600	500–600	350	2.9–5.0
Diethylstilbestrol	?	?	?	2.9–3.4	?	?	26–28	25–37	20	5.7–7.5
Sources and footnotes Notes: Values are ratios, with estradiol as standard (i.e., 1.0). Abbreviations: HF = Clinical relief of hot flashes. VE = Increased proliferation of vaginal epithelium. UCa = Decrease in UCa. FSH = Suppression of FSH levels. LH = Suppression of LH levels. HDL-C, SHBG, CBG, and AGT = Increase in the serum levels of these liver proteins. Liver = Ratio of liver estrogenic effects to general/systemic estrogenic effects (hot flashes/gonadotropins). Sources: See template.

Potencies and durations of natural estrogens by intramuscular injection
Estrogen	Form	Dose (mg)		Duration by dose (mg)
Estrogen	Form	EPD	CICD	Duration by dose (mg)
Estradiol	Aq. soln.	?	–	<1 d
Estradiol	Oil soln.	40–60	–	1–2 ≈ 1–2 d
Estradiol	Aq. susp.	?	3.5	0.5–2 ≈ 2–7 d; 3.5 ≈ >5 d
Estradiol	Microsph.	?	–	1 ≈ 30 d
Estradiol benzoate	Oil soln.	25–35	–	1.66 ≈ 2–3 d; 5 ≈ 3–6 d
Estradiol benzoate	Aq. susp.	20	–	10 ≈ 16–21 d
Estradiol benzoate	Emulsion	?	–	10 ≈ 14–21 d
Estradiol dipropionate	Oil soln.	25–30	–	5 ≈ 5–8 d
Estradiol valerate	Oil soln.	20–30	5	5 ≈ 7–8 d; 10 ≈ 10–14 d; 40 ≈ 14–21 d; 100 ≈ 21–28 d
Estradiol benz. butyrate	Oil soln.	?	10	10 ≈ 21 d
Estradiol cypionate	Oil soln.	20–30	–	5 ≈ 11–14 d
Estradiol cypionate	Aq. susp.	?	5	5 ≈ 14–24 d
Estradiol enanthate	Oil soln.	?	5–10	10 ≈ 20–30 d
Estradiol dienanthate	Oil soln.	?	–	7.5 ≈ >40 d
Estradiol undecylate	Oil soln.	?	–	10–20 ≈ 40–60 d; 25–50 ≈ 60–120 d
Polyestradiol phosphate	Aq. soln.	40–60	–	40 ≈ 30 d; 80 ≈ 60 d; 160 ≈ 120 d
Estrone	Oil soln.	?	–	1–2 ≈ 2–3 d
Estrone	Aq. susp.	?	–	0.1–2 ≈ 2–7 d
Estriol	Oil soln.	?	–	1–2 ≈ 1–4 d
Polyestriol phosphate	Aq. soln.	?	–	50 ≈ 30 d; 80 ≈ 60 d
Notes and sources Notes: All aqueous suspensions are of microcrystalline particle size. Estradiol production during the menstrual cycle is 30–640 µg/d (6.4–8.6 mg total per month or cycle). The vaginal epithelium maturation dosage of estradiol benzoate or estradiol valerate has been reported as 5 to 7 mg/week. An effective ovulation-inhibiting dose of estradiol undecylate is 20–30 mg/month. Sources: See template.

Pharmacology of estrone
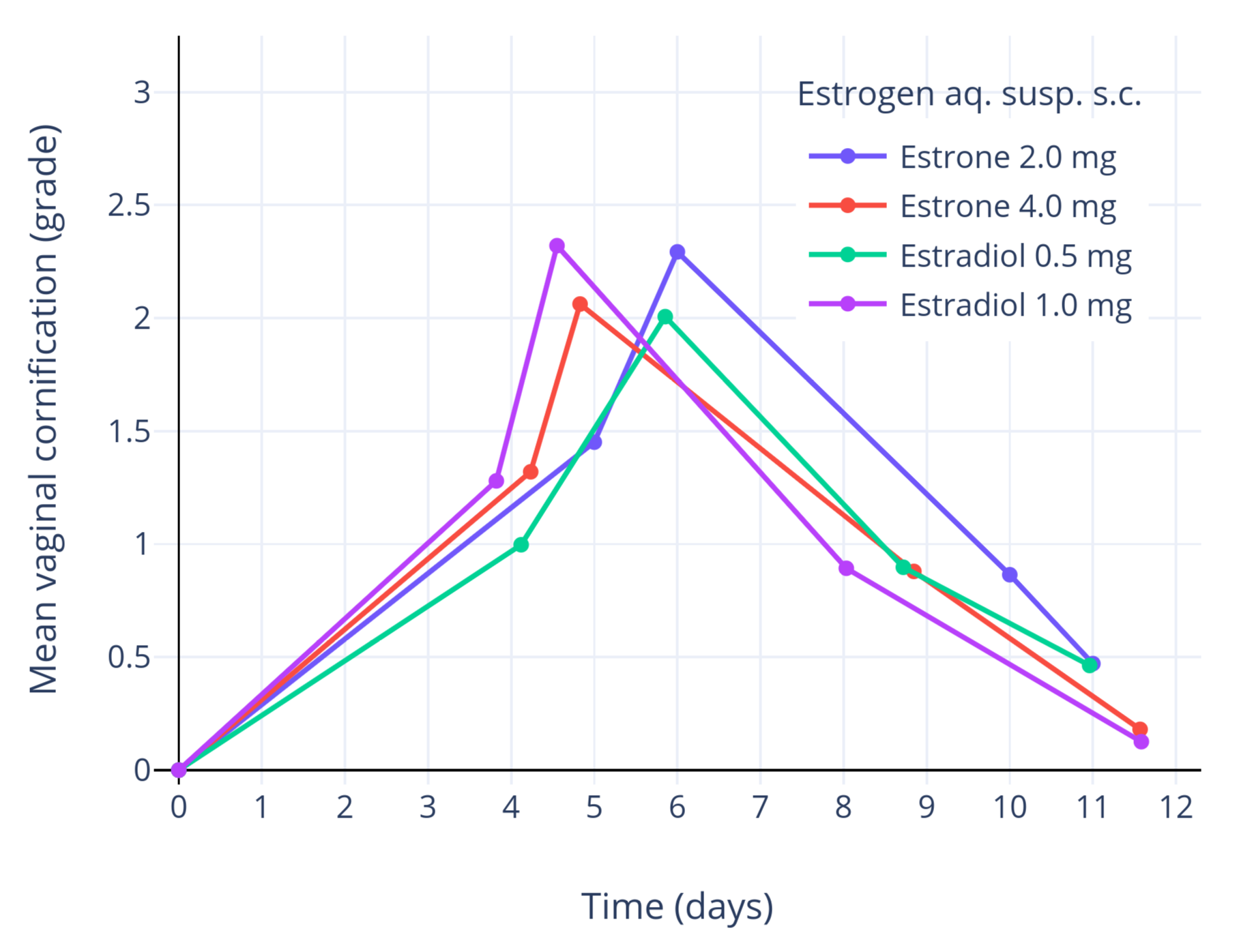
Mean vaginal cornification (grade) with a single subcutaneous injection of estrone or estradiol in aqueous suspension in around 10 women each. Vaginal cornification grade is percentage cornification of vaginal epithelial cells and is 1 (+) = 10–25%, 2 (++) = 25–50%, and 3 (+++) = 50–75%.

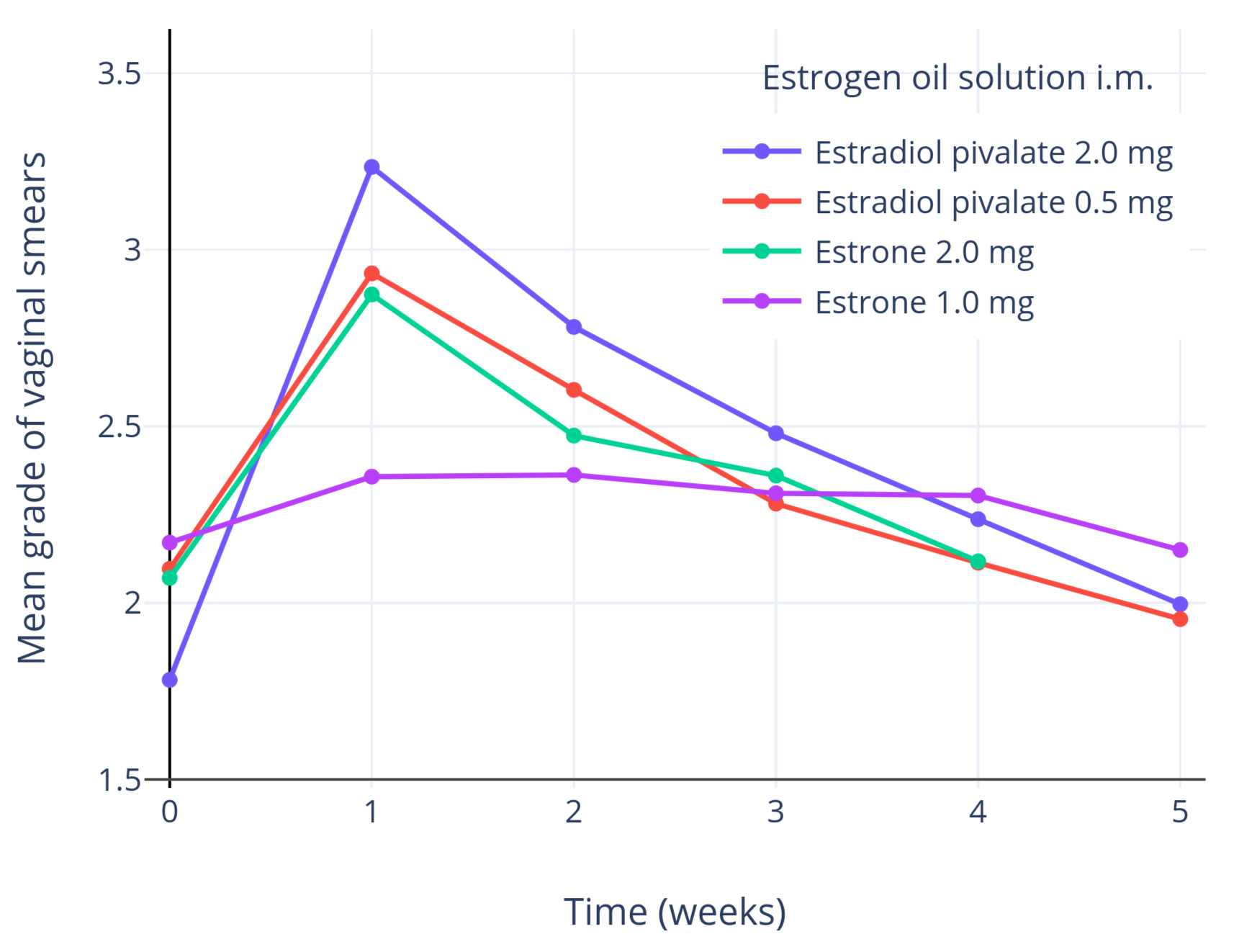
Mean change in vaginal smear test grade with different doses of estradiol pivalate (Estrotate) and estrone (Theelin-In-Oil) in oil solution by intramuscular injection in 10 to 20 women each. Vaginal smear test grades were 1 = atrophic, 2 = intermediate cells, 3 = early cornification, 4 = full cornification.

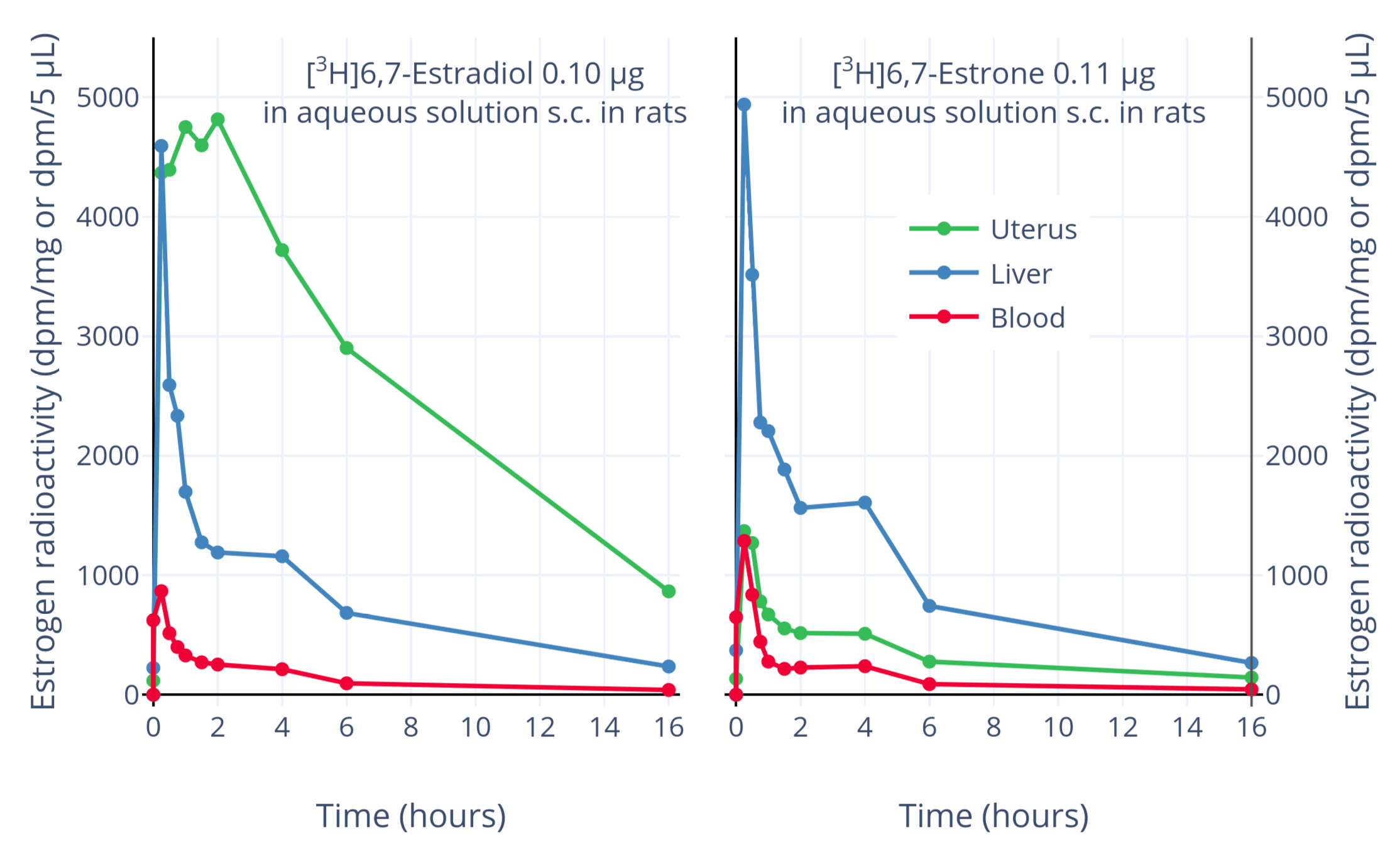
Distribution of estrogen radioactivity (dpm/mg tissue or dpm/5 μL blood) in blood and tissues after a subcutaneous injection of 0.10 μg [^{3}H]6,7-estradiol or 0.11 μg [^{3}H]6,7-estrone in aqueous solution in rats. At 2 hours uterine radioactivity with tritiated estrone was about one-tenth that of tritiated estradiol and almost all of the uterine radioactivity was estradiol.
Sources: See template page.

=== Pharmacokinetics ===
==== Absorption ====
Like estradiol, estrone has poor oral bioavailability. It has been said that, taken by mouth in non-micronized form, a dose of 25 mg estrone is approximately equivalent to 2.5 mg conjugated estrogens, 50 μg ethinylestradiol, or 1 mg diethylstilbestrol in terms of estrogenic potency. Due to its weak oral activity, estrone has been used parenterally instead, for instance by intramuscular injection or vaginal administration. The pharmacokinetics of vaginal estrone have been studied.

Estrone in oil solution by intramuscular injection has a shorter duration than estrone in aqueous suspension by intramuscular injection. Estrone in oil solution by intramuscular injection is rapidly absorbed, while estrone in aqueous suspension has a prolonged period of absorption. Upon intramuscular injection of estrone in aqueous solution, the water from the preparation is absorbed and a microcrystalline depot of estrone that is slowly absorbed by the body is formed. This is responsible for the prolonged duration of estrone in aqueous suspension compared to oil solution.

==== Distribution ====
Unlike estradiol and estriol, estrone is not accumulated in target tissues. In terms of plasma protein binding, estrone is bound approximately 16% to sex hormone-binding globulin (SHBG) and 80% to albumin, with the remainder (2.0 to 4.0%) circulating free or unbound. Estrone has about 24% of the relative binding affinity of estradiol for SHBG, and hence is relatively poorly bound to SHBG.

==== Metabolism ====
Metabolic pathways of estradiol in humans

Description: The metabolic pathways involved in the metabolism of estradiol and other natural estrogens (e.g., estrone, estriol) in humans. In addition to the metabolic transformations shown in the diagram, conjugation (e.g., sulfation and glucuronidation) occurs in the case of estradiol and metabolites of estradiol that have one or more available hydroxyl (–OH) groups. Sources: See template page.

Estrone is conjugated into estrogen conjugates such as estrone sulfate and estrone glucuronide by sulfotransferases and glucuronidases, and can also be hydroxylated by cytochrome P450 enzymes into catechol estrogens such as 2-hydroxyestrone and 4-hydroxyestrone or into estriol. Both of these transformations take place predominantly in the liver. Estrone can also be reversibly converted into estradiol by 17β-hydroxysteroid dehydrogenases (17β-HSDs), and this accounts for most or all of its estrogenic activity. 17β-HSD isoforms that are involved in the conversion of estrone into estradiol include 17β-HSD1, 17β-HSD3, 17β-HSD4, 17β-HSD7, 17β-HSD8, and 17β-HSD12, although the relative contributions of the different isoforms is unknown.

The biological half-lives of estrone and estradiol in the circulation are both about 10 to 70 minutes, whereas the biological half-life of estrone sulfate in the circulation is about 10 to 12 hours. The metabolic clearance rate of estrone is 1,050 L/day/m^{2} and of estradiol is 580 L/day/m^{2}, while that of estrone sulfate is 80 L/day/m^{2}. For comparison, the metabolic clearance rate of estriol is 1,110 L/day/m^{2}. A single 1 to 2 mg dose of estrone in oil solution by intramuscular injection has a duration of about 2 or 3 days. As an aqueous suspension by intramuscular injection, estrone was used at a dose of 0.1 to 0.5 mg 2 to 3 times per week, or at a dose of 0.1 to 2 mg once a week or in divided doses. In one rodent study, exogenous estrone was administered and increased circulating estradiol levels by about 10-fold; co-administration of a selective 17β-HSD1 inhibitor decreased estradiol levels by about 50%.

The ratio of circulating estrone to circulating estradiol is the same at about 5:1 with both oral estradiol and oral estrone sulfate. An investigational estrone vaginal ring was found to result in a ratio of estrone to estradiol of 4:1 or 5:1 initially, but this decreased to about 1:1 with continuous therapy.

==== Excretion ====
Estrone is excreted in urine in the form of estrogen conjugates such as estrone sulfate and estrone glucuronide. Following an intravenous injection of labeled estrone in women, almost 90% is excreted in urine and feces within 4 to 5 days. Enterohepatic recirculation causes a delay in excretion of estrone.

== Chemistry ==
Structures of major endogenous estrogens
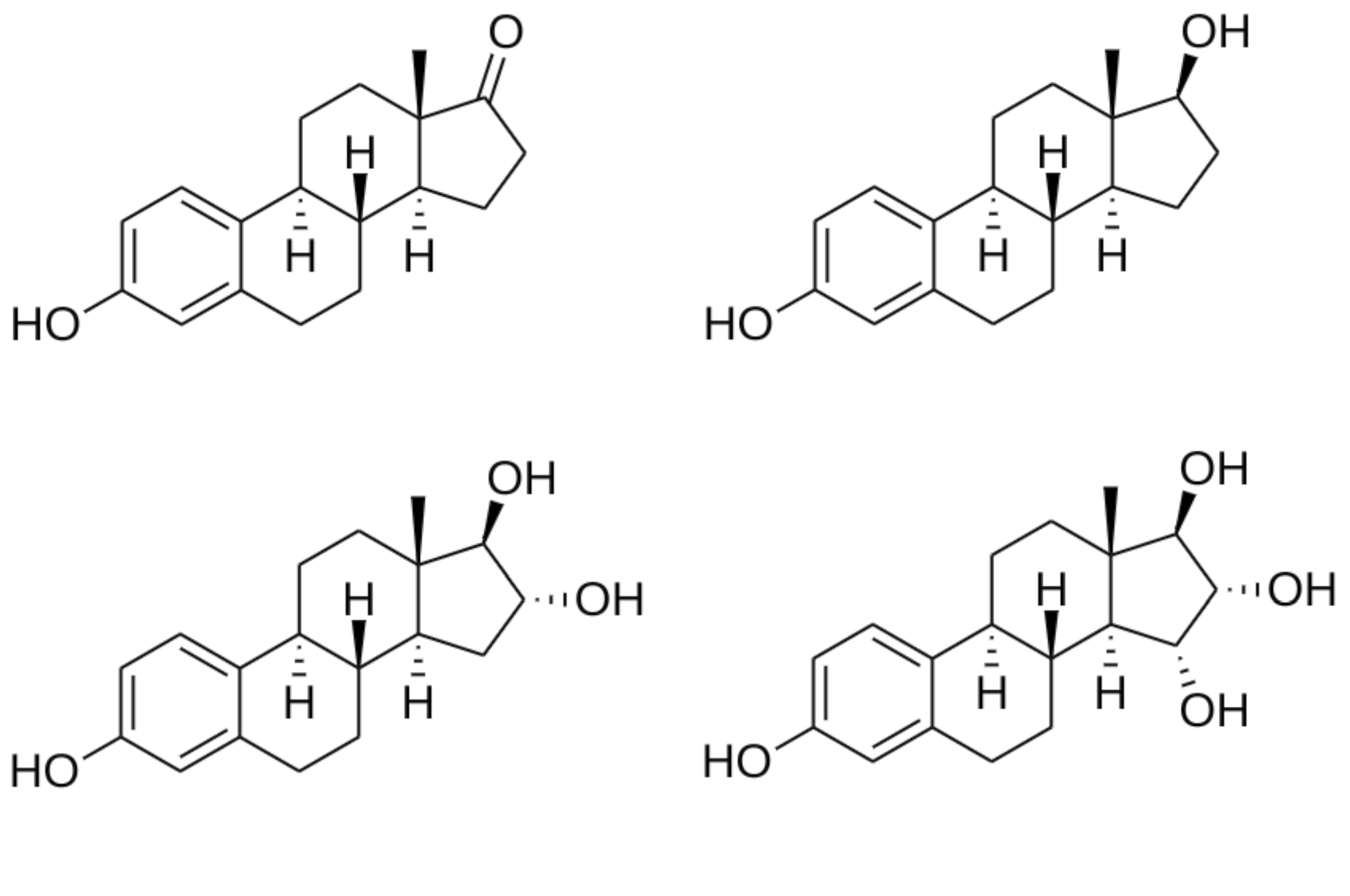
Note the hydroxyl (–OH) groups: estrone (E1) has one, estradiol (E2) has two, estriol (E3) has three, and estetrol (E4) has four.

Estrone, also known as estra-1,3,5(10)-trien-3-ol-17-one, is a naturally occurring estrane steroid with double bonds at the C1, C3, and C5 positions, a hydroxyl group at the C3 position, and a ketone group at the C17 position. The name estrone was derived from the chemical terms estrin (estra-1,3,5(10)-triene) and ketone.

A variety of estrone esters have been synthesized and described. These include the marketed esters estrone acetate, estrone sulfate, estrone tetraacetylglucoside, and estropipate (piperazine estrone sulfate), and the never-marketed esters estrone benzoate, estrone cyanate, estrone glucuronide, and estrone sulfamate.

== History ==
In 1927, Bernhard Zondek and Selmar Aschheim discovered that large amounts of estrogens were excreted in the urine of pregnant women. This rich source of estrogens allowed the development of potent estrogenic formulations for scientific and clinical use. In 1929, pure crystalline estrone was isolated from the urine of pregnant women by various researchers. By 1929, pharmaceutical preparations including Amniotin (Squibb), Progynon (Schering), and Theelin (Parke-Davis), purified from pregnancy urine, placentas, and/or amniotic fluid and containing purified estrone or mixtures of estrogens that included estrone, were being sold commercially for use by intramuscular injection. Other products and brand names of estrone marketed in the 1930s included Estrone (Abbott, Lilly), Oestroform (British Drug Houses), Folliculin (Organon), Menformon (Organon), and Ketodestrin (Paines & Byrne), among others. These formulations included ampoules of oil or aqueous solution for intramuscular injection, oral tablets, and vaginal suppositories. Estrone in aqueous suspension for use by intramuscular injection was first described in 1941 and was introduced for medical use under the brand name Theelin Aqueous Suspension by 1944.

== Society and culture ==
=== Generic names ===
Estrone is the generic name of estrone in American English and its INN, USP, BAN, DCF, DCIT, and JAN. Oestrone, in which the "O" is silent, was the former BAN of estrone and its name in British English, but the spelling was eventually changed to estrone.

=== Brand names ===
Estrone has been marketed under a variety of brand names, including Andrestraq, Aquacrine, A.T.V., Bestrone, Centrogen, Cicatral, Cormone, Crinovaryl, Cristallovar, Crystogen, Destrone, Disynformon, Endofolliculina, Estragyn, Estroject, Estrol, Estrone, Estrone Aqueous Suspension, Estrone-A, Estrugenone, Estrusol, Femestrone, Femidyn, Folikrin, Folipex, Folisan, Folliculin, Follicunodis, Follidrin, Gineburno, Glandubolin, Grietalgen, Grietalgen Hidrocort, Gynogen, Hiestrone, Hormofollin, Hormonin, Hormovarine, Kestrin, Kestrone, Ketodestrin, Kolpon, Ladies Pearl, Livifolin, Menagen, Metharmon-F, Neo-Estrone, Oestrilin, Oestrin, Oestroform, Oestroperos, Ovex, Ovifollin, Perlatan, Progynon, Senikolp, Solliculin, Solutio Folliculinum, Synergon (in combination with progesterone), Theelin, Thynestron, Tokokin, Unden, Unigen, Wehgen, and Wynestron.

Brand names of estrone in aqueous suspension specifically include Bestrone, Estaqua, Estrofol, Estroject, Estrone-A, Estronol, Femogen, Foygen Aqueous, Gravigen Aqueous, Gynogen, Hormogen-A, Kestrin Aqueous, Kestrone, Theelin Aqueous, Theogen, Unigen, and Wehgen.

=== Availability ===
Although estrone has been widely marketed in the past, it has mostly been discontinued and remains available in only a few countries. These countries reportedly include Canada, Georgia, Monaco, and Taiwan. However, estrone remains widely available throughout the world in the form of estrone sulfate, which can be found in estropipate (piperazine estrone sulfate), conjugated estrogens (Premarin), and esterified estrogens (Estratab, Menest).

== Research ==
An estrone vaginal ring was developed and studied for use in menopausal hormone therapy. It increased estrogen levels, suppressed gonadotropin levels, and relieved menopausal symptoms. Subcutaneous pellet implantation of estrone has also been studied.

== See also ==
- Estradiol/estrone/estriol
- Estrone/progesterone
- Estrogenic substances
