= 17β-Dihydroequilin =

Chemical compound

Clinical data
- Other names: β-Dihydroequilin; Δ^{7}-17β-Estradiol; 7-Dehydro-17β-estradiol; Estra-1,3,5(10),7-tetraen-3,17β-diol; NSC-12170
- Routes of administration: By mouth
- Drug class: Estrogen

Identifiers
- IUPAC name: (9S,13S,14S,17S)-13-Methyl-6,9,11,12,14,15,16,17-octahydrocyclopenta[a]phenanthrene-3,17-diol
- CAS Number: 3563-27-7
- PubChem CID: 11954027
- ChemSpider: 10128322
- UNII: WXG88DST4R
- ChEBI: CHEBI:62851
- ChEMBL: ChEMBL121458
- CompTox Dashboard (EPA): DTXSID40871892
- ECHA InfoCard: 100.020.576

Chemical and physical data
- Formula: C_{18}H_{22}O_{2}
- Molar mass: 270.372 g·mol^{−1}
- 3D model (JSmol): Interactive image
- SMILES: C[C@]12CC[C@H]3C(=CCC4=C3C=CC(=C4)O)[C@@H]1CC[C@@H]2O
- InChI: InChI=1S/C18H22O2/c1-18-9-8-14-13-5-3-12(19)10-11(13)2-4-15(14)16(18)6-7-17(18)20/h3-5,10,14,16-17,19-20H,2,6-9H2,1H3/t14-,16+,17+,18+/m1/s1; Key:NLLMJANWPUQQTA-UBDQQSCGSA-N

17β-Dihydroequilin is a naturally occurring estrogen sex hormone found in horses as well as a medication. As the C3 sulfate ester sodium salt, it is a minor constituent (1.7%) of conjugated estrogens (CEEs; brand name Premarin). However, as equilin, with equilin sulfate being a major component of CEEs, is transformed into 17β-dihydroequilin in the body, analogously to the conversion of estrone into estradiol, 17β-dihydroequilin is, along with estradiol, the most important estrogen responsible for the effects of CEEs.

== Pharmacology ==
=== Pharmacodynamics ===
17β-Dihydroequilin is an estrogen, or an agonist of the estrogen receptors (ERs), the ERα and ERβ. In terms of relative binding affinity for the ERs, 17β-dihydroequilin has about 113% and 108% of that of estradiol for the ERα and ERβ, respectively. 17β-Dihydroequilin has about 83% of the relative potency of CEEs in the vagina and 200% of the relative potency of CEEs in the uterus. Of the equine estrogens, it shows the highest estrogenic activity and greatest estrogenic potency.

Like CEEs as a whole, 17β-dihydroequilin has disproportionate effects in certain tissues such as the liver and uterus. Equilin, the second major component of conjugated estrogens after estrone, is reversibly transformed into 17β-dihydroequilin analogously to the transformation of estrone into estradiol. However, whereas the balance of mutual interconversion of estrone and estradiol is largely shifted in the direction of estrone, it is nearly equal in the case of equilin and 17β-dihydroequilin. As such, although 17β-dihydroequilin is only a minor constituent of CEEs, it is, along with estradiol, the most important estrogen relevant to the estrogenic activity of the medication.

Relative oral potencies of estrogens
Estrogen	HF	VE	UCa	FSH	LH	HDL-C	SHBG	CBG	AGT	Liver
Estradiol	1.0	1.0	1.0	1.0	1.0	1.0	1.0	1.0	1.0	1.0
Estrone	?	?	?	0.3	0.3	?	?	?	?	?
Estriol	0.3	0.3	0.1	0.3	0.3	0.2	?	?	?	0.67
Estrone sulfate	?	0.9	0.9	0.8–0.9	0.9	0.5	0.9	0.5–0.7	1.4–1.5	0.56–1.7
Conjugated estrogens	1.2	1.5	2.0	1.1–1.3	1.0	1.5	3.0–3.2	1.3–1.5	5.0	1.3–4.5
Equilin sulfate	?	?	1.0	?	?	6.0	7.5	6.0	7.5	?
Ethinylestradiol	120	150	400	60–150	100	400	500–600	500–600	350	2.9–5.0
Diethylstilbestrol	?	?	?	2.9–3.4	?	?	26–28	25–37	20	5.7–7.5
Sources and footnotes Notes: Values are ratios, with estradiol as standard (i.e., 1.0). Abbreviations: HF = Clinical relief of hot flashes. VE = Increased proliferation of vaginal epithelium. UCa = Decrease in UCa. FSH = Suppression of FSH levels. LH = Suppression of LH levels. HDL-C, SHBG, CBG, and AGT = Increase in the serum levels of these liver proteins. Liver = Ratio of liver estrogenic effects to general/systemic estrogenic effects (hot flashes/gonadotropins). Sources: See template.

=== Pharmacokinetics ===
17β-Dihydroequilin has about 30% of the relative binding affinity of testosterone for sex hormone-binding globulin (SHBG), relative to 50% for estradiol. The metabolic clearance rate of 17β-dihydroequilin is 1,250 L/day/m^{2}, relative to 580 L/day/m^{2} for estradiol.

== Chemistry ==
17β-Dihydroequilin, or simply β-dihydroequilin, also known as δ^{7}-17β-estradiol or as 7-dehydro-17β-estradiol, as well as estra-1,3,5(10),7-tetraen-3,17β-diol, is a naturally occurring estrane steroid and an analogue of estradiol. In terms of chemical structure and pharmacology, equilin (δ^{7}-estrone) is to 17β-dihydroequilin as estrone is to estradiol.
