= C19H21NO2 =

The molecular formula C_{19}H_{21}NO_{2} (molar mass: 295.37 g/mol) may refer to:

- Estrone cyanate, a steroid
- Nuciferine, an alkaloid
- Oxitriptyline, an anticonvulsant
- Propylnorapomorphine, a dopamine agonist
- SKF-77,434
- 5-APB-NBOMe
- URB602, a cannabinoid
