= C18H22O5S =

The molecular formula C_{18}H_{22}O_{5}S (molar mass: 350.43 g/mol, exact mass: 350.1188 u) may refer to:

- Estropipate, or piperazine estrone sulfate
- Estrone sulfate, or estrone 3-sulfate
