= ZYC =

ZYC may refer to:

- Cleopatra (group), also known as Cleopatra ZYC
- Estradiol 17β-benzoate, an estrogen ester also known as ZYC-30
