= C19H26O4 =

The molecular formula C_{19}H_{26}O_{4} (molar mass: 318.407 g/mol, exact mass: 318.1831 u) may refer to:

- Methoxyestriol
  - 2-Methoxyestriol (2-MeO-E3)
  - 4-Methoxyestriol (4-MeO-E3)
