= Estropipate =

Estrogen medication

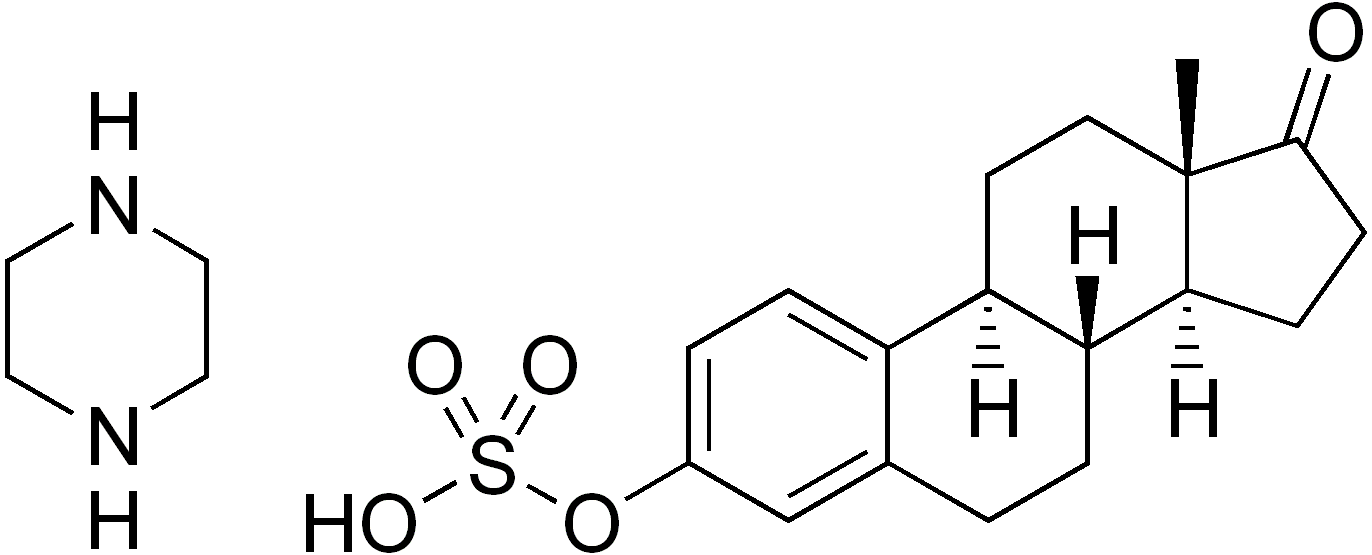

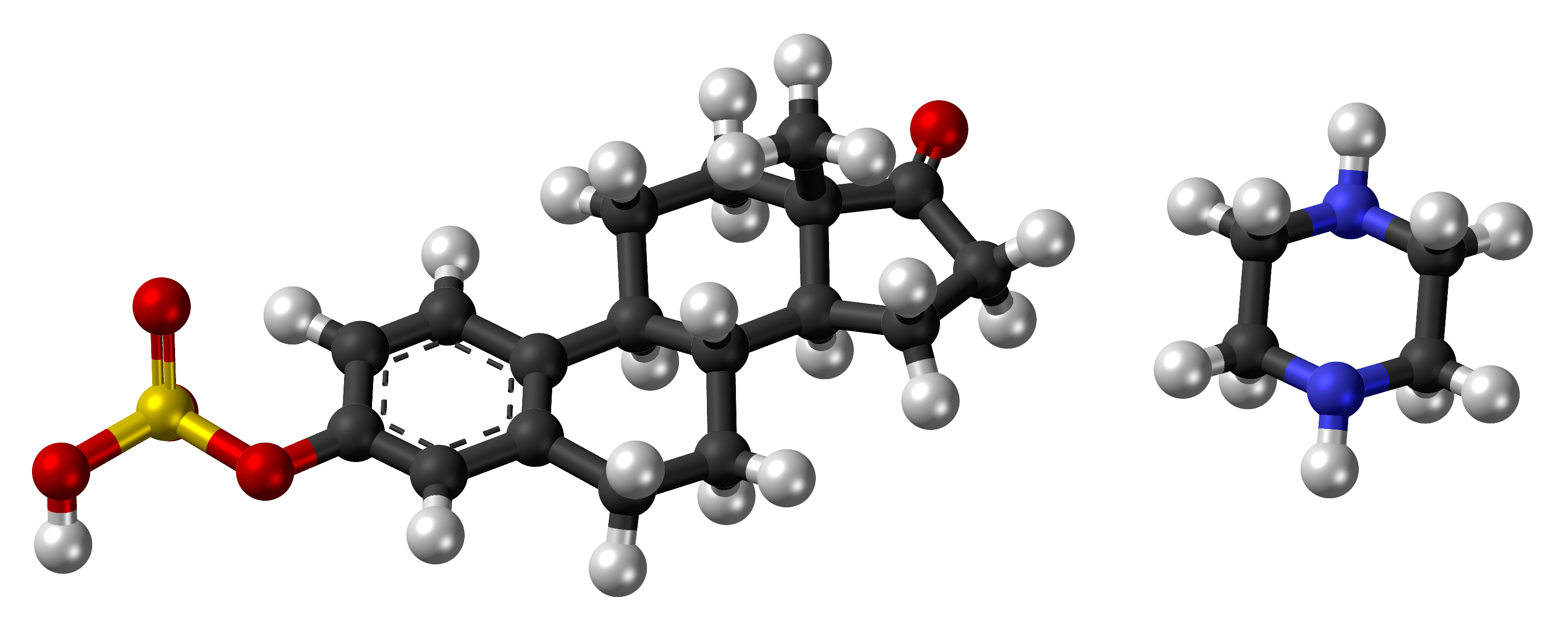

Clinical data
- Trade names: Harmogen, Improvera, Ogen, Ortho-Est, Sulestrex, others
- Other names: Piperazine estrone sulfate; Estrone sulfate piperazine salt; Pipestrone
- AHFS/Drugs.com: Monograph
- Routes of administration: By mouth
- Drug class: Estrogen; Estrogen ester
- ATC code: None

Identifiers
- IUPAC name: [(8R,9S,13S,14S)-13-Methyl-17-oxo-7,8,9,11,12,14,15,16-octahydro-6H-cyclopenta[a]phenanthren-3-yl] hydrogen sulfate; piperazine
- CAS Number: 7280-37-7
- PubChem CID: 5284555
- DrugBank: DB04574
- ChemSpider: 4447610
- UNII: SVI38UY019
- KEGG: D00948
- ChEBI: CHEBI:4873
- ChEMBL: ChEMBL1200980
- CompTox Dashboard (EPA): DTXSID3023005
- ECHA InfoCard: 100.027.906

Chemical and physical data
- Formula: C_{22}H_{32}N_{2}O_{5}S
- Molar mass: 436.57 g·mol^{−1}
- 3D model (JSmol): Interactive image
- SMILES: O=S(=O)(O)Oc1cc4c(cc1)[C@@H]3[C@H]([C@@H]2CCC(=O)[C@@]2(C)CC3)CC4.N1CCNCC1
- InChI: InChI=1S/C18H22O5S.C4H10N2/c1-18-9-8-14-13-5-3-12(23-24(20,21)22)10-11(13)2-4-15(14)16(18)6-7-17(18)19;1-2-6-4-3-5-1/h3,5,10,14-16H,2,4,6-9H2,1H3,(H,20,21,22);5-6H,1-4H2/t14-,15-,16+,18+;/m1./s1; Key:HZEQBCVBILBTEP-ZFINNJDLSA-N

Estropipate, also known as piperazine estrone sulfate and sold under the brand names Harmogen, Improvera, Ogen, Ortho-Est, and Sulestrex among others, is an estrogen medication which is used mainly in menopausal hormone therapy in the treatment of menopausal symptoms. It is a salt of estrone sulfate and piperazine, and is transformed into estrone and estradiol in the body. It is taken by mouth.

== Medical uses ==
Estropipate is used to:

- Alleviate symptoms of menopause as menopausal hormone therapy
- Treat some types of infertility
- Treat some conditions leading to underdevelopment of female sexual characteristics
- Treat vaginal atrophy
- Treat some types of breast cancer (particularly in men and postmenopausal women)
- Treat prostate cancer
- Prevent osteoporosis

Estrogen dosages for menopausal hormone therapy
Route/form	Estrogen	Low	Standard	High
Oral	Estradiol	0.5–1 mg/day	1–2 mg/day	2–4 mg/day
Oral	Estradiol valerate	0.5–1 mg/day	1–2 mg/day	2–4 mg/day
Oral	Estradiol acetate	0.45–0.9 mg/day	0.9–1.8 mg/day	1.8–3.6 mg/day
Oral	Conjugated estrogens	0.3–0.45 mg/day	0.625 mg/day	0.9–1.25 mg/day
Oral	Esterified estrogens	0.3–0.45 mg/day	0.625 mg/day	0.9–1.25 mg/day
Oral	Estropipate	0.75 mg/day	1.5 mg/day	3 mg/day
Oral	Estriol	1–2 mg/day	2–4 mg/day	4–8 mg/day
Oral	Ethinylestradiol^{a}	2.5–10 μg/day	5–20 μg/day	–
Nasal spray	Estradiol	150 μg/day	300 μg/day	600 μg/day
Transdermal patch	Estradiol	25 μg/day^{b}	50 μg/day^{b}	100 μg/day^{b}
Transdermal gel	Estradiol	0.5 mg/day	1–1.5 mg/day	2–3 mg/day
Vaginal	Estradiol	25 μg/day	–	–
Vaginal	Estriol	30 μg/day	0.5 mg 2x/week	0.5 mg/day
IM or SC injection	Estradiol valerate	–	–	4 mg 1x/4 weeks
IM or SC injection	Estradiol cypionate	1 mg 1x/3–4 weeks	3 mg 1x/3–4 weeks	5 mg 1x/3–4 weeks
IM or SC injection	Estradiol benzoate	0.5 mg 1x/week	1 mg 1x/week	1.5 mg 1x/week
SC implant	Estradiol	25 mg 1x/6 months	50 mg 1x/6 months	100 mg 1x/6 months
Footnotes: ^{a} = No longer used or recommended, due to health concerns. ^{b} = As a single patch applied once or twice per week (worn for 3–4 days or 7 days), depending on the formulation. Note: Dosages are not necessarily equivalent. Sources: See template.

=== Available forms ===
Estropipate was available in the form of 0.75, 1.5, 3, and 6 mg oral tablets and 1.5 mg/gram vaginal cream. Estropipate is no longer available in the United States.

== Pharmacology ==
=== Pharmacodynamics ===
Estropipate is a prodrug of estrone and estradiol. Hence, it is an estrogen, or an agonist of the estrogen receptors.

Relative oral potencies of estrogens
Estrogen	HF	VE	UCa	FSH	LH	HDL-C	SHBG	CBG	AGT	Liver
Estradiol	1.0	1.0	1.0	1.0	1.0	1.0	1.0	1.0	1.0	1.0
Estrone	?	?	?	0.3	0.3	?	?	?	?	?
Estriol	0.3	0.3	0.1	0.3	0.3	0.2	?	?	?	0.67
Estrone sulfate	?	0.9	0.9	0.8–0.9	0.9	0.5	0.9	0.5–0.7	1.4–1.5	0.56–1.7
Conjugated estrogens	1.2	1.5	2.0	1.1–1.3	1.0	1.5	3.0–3.2	1.3–1.5	5.0	1.3–4.5
Equilin sulfate	?	?	1.0	?	?	6.0	7.5	6.0	7.5	?
Ethinylestradiol	120	150	400	60–150	100	400	500–600	500–600	350	2.9–5.0
Diethylstilbestrol	?	?	?	2.9–3.4	?	?	26–28	25–37	20	5.7–7.5
Sources and footnotes Notes: Values are ratios, with estradiol as standard (i.e., 1.0). Abbreviations: HF = Clinical relief of hot flashes. VE = Increased proliferation of vaginal epithelium. UCa = Decrease in UCa. FSH = Suppression of FSH levels. LH = Suppression of LH levels. HDL-C, SHBG, CBG, and AGT = Increase in the serum levels of these liver proteins. Liver = Ratio of liver estrogenic effects to general/systemic estrogenic effects (hot flashes/gonadotropins). Sources: See template.

=== Pharmacokinetics ===
Estropipate is hydrolyzed into estrone in the body. Estrone can then be transformed into estradiol by 17β-hydroxysteroid dehydrogenase.

== History ==
Estropipate was introduced for medical use by Abbott in 1968. It was approved by the FDA in the United States in 1991.

== Society and culture ==
=== Generic names ===
Estropipate is the generic name of the drug and its INN, USAN, and BAN.

=== Brand names ===
Estropipate was marketed under the brand names Genoral, Harmogen, Improvera, Ogen, Ortho-Est, and Sulestrex among others.

=== Availability ===
Estropipate has been discontinued in the United States. In the past, estropipate has also been marketed in Canada, the United Kingdom, Ireland, Switzerland, Australia, South Africa, Mexico, and Indonesia.
