= Estradiol/estrone/estriol =

Combination drug

Combination of
- Estradiol: Estrogen
- Estrone: Estrogen
- Estriol: Estrogen

Clinical data
- Trade names: Hormonin
- Routes of administration: By mouth

Identifiers
- CAS Number: 79275-73-3

Estradiol/estrone/estriol (brand name Hormonin) is a combination pharmaceutical medication produced by Shire which contains the estrogens estradiol (0.3 or 0.6 mg), estrone (0.7 or 1.4 mg), and estriol (0.135 or 0.27 mg) in a single oral tablet.

== See also ==
- List of combined sex-hormonal preparations
