= Estrone cyanate =

Chemical compound

Clinical data
- Other names: Estrocyanate; Estrone 3-O-cyanate; Estrone 3-cyanate
- Routes of administration: By mouth

Identifiers
- IUPAC name: 17-Oxoestra-1(10),2,4-trien-3-yl cyanate
- CAS Number: 23623-36-1
- ChemSpider: 26377079
- UNII: YV53AV45DS

Chemical and physical data
- Formula: C_{19}H_{21}NO_{2}
- Molar mass: 295.382 g·mol^{−1}
- 3D model (JSmol): Interactive image
- SMILES: C[C@]12CC[C@@H]3c4ccc(cc4CC[C@H]3[C@@H]1CCC2=O)OC#N
- InChI: InChI=1S/C19H21NO2/c1-19-9-8-15-14-5-3-13(22-11-20)10-12(14)2-4-16(15)17(19)6-7-18(19)21/h3,5,10,15-17H,2,4,6-9H2,1H3/t15-,16-,17+,19+/m1/s1; Key:OIOQBNDENVAFEU-VXNCWWDNSA-N

Estrone cyanate, or estrone 3-O-cyanate, also known as estrocyanate, is an estrogen and an estrogen ester – specifically, the 3-O-cyanate ester of estrone – which was investigated for potential use in birth control pills but was found to be of relatively low potency and ultimately was never marketed.
