= 2-Methoxyestriol =

Names
- IUPAC name 2-Methoxyestra-1,3,5(10)-triene-3,16α,17β-triol
- Systematic IUPAC name (1R,2R,3aS,3bR,9bS,11aS)-8-Methoxy-11a-methyl-2,3,3a,3b,4,5,9b,10,11,11a-decahydro-1H-cyclopenta[a]phenanthrene-1,2,7-triol
- Other names 2-MeO-E3

Identifiers
CAS Number	1236-72-2
3D model (JSmol)	Interactive image
ChEMBL	ChEMBL1908077
ChemSpider	92169
PubChem CID	102031
CompTox Dashboard (EPA)	DTXSID60924551
- InChI: InChI=1S/C19H26O4/c1-19-6-5-11-12(14(19)9-16(21)18(19)22)4-3-10-7-15(20)17(23-2)8-13(10)11/h7-8,11-12,14,16,18,20-22H,3-6,9H2,1-2H3/t11-,12+,14-,16+,18-,19-/m0/s1 Key: PEXPJFWTSZLEAQ-YSYMNNNUSA-N
- SMILES: C[C@]12CC[C@H]3[C@H]([C@@H]1C[C@H]([C@@H]2O)O)CCC4=CC(=C(C=C34)OC)O

Properties
Chemical formula	C_{19}H_{26}O_{4}
Molar mass	318.413 g·mol^{−1}
- Except where otherwise noted, data are given for materials in their standard state (at 25 °C [77 °F], 100 kPa). Infobox references

2-Methoxyestriol (2-MeO-E3) is an endogenous estrogen metabolite. It is specifically a metabolite of estriol and 2-hydroxyestriol. It has negligible affinity for the estrogen receptors and no estrogenic activity. However, 2-methoxyestriol does have some non-estrogen receptor-mediated cholesterol-lowering effects.

Selected biological properties of endogenous estrogens in rats
Estrogen	ER RBA (%)	Uterine weight (%)	Uterotrophy	LH levels (%)	SHBG RBA (%)
Control	–	100	–	100	–
Estradiol (E2)	100	506 ± 20	+++	12–19	100
Estrone (E1)	11 ± 8	490 ± 22	+++	?	20
Estriol (E3)	10 ± 4	468 ± 30	+++	8–18	3
Estetrol (E4)	0.5 ± 0.2	?	Inactive	?	1
17α-Estradiol	4.2 ± 0.8	?	?	?	?
2-Hydroxyestradiol	24 ± 7	285 ± 8	+^{b}	31–61	28
2-Methoxyestradiol	0.05 ± 0.04	101	Inactive	?	130
4-Hydroxyestradiol	45 ± 12	?	?	?	?
4-Methoxyestradiol	1.3 ± 0.2	260	++	?	9
4-Fluoroestradiol^{a}	180 ± 43	?	+++	?	?
2-Hydroxyestrone	1.9 ± 0.8	130 ± 9	Inactive	110–142	8
2-Methoxyestrone	0.01 ± 0.00	103 ± 7	Inactive	95–100	120
4-Hydroxyestrone	11 ± 4	351	++	21–50	35
4-Methoxyestrone	0.13 ± 0.04	338	++	65–92	12
16α-Hydroxyestrone	2.8 ± 1.0	552 ± 42	+++	7–24	<0.5
2-Hydroxyestriol	0.9 ± 0.3	302	+^{b}	?	?
2-Methoxyestriol	0.01 ± 0.00	?	Inactive	?	4
Notes: Values are mean ± SD or range. ER RBA = Relative binding affinity to estrogen receptors of rat uterine cytosol. Uterine weight = Percentage change in uterine wet weight of ovariectomized rats after 72 hours with continuous administration of 1 μg/hour via subcutaneously implanted osmotic pumps. LH levels = Luteinizing hormone levels relative to baseline of ovariectomized rats after 24 to 72 hours of continuous administration via subcutaneous implant. Footnotes: ^{a} = Synthetic (i.e., not endogenous). ^{b} = Atypical uterotrophic effect which plateaus within 48 hours (estradiol's uterotrophy continues linearly up to 72 hours). Sources:

== See also ==
- 2-Methoxyestradiol
- 2-Methoxyestrone
- 4-Methoxyestradiol
- 4-Methoxyestrone
