= HPTE =

Names
- Preferred IUPAC name 4,4′-(2,2,2-Trichloroethane-1,1-diyl)diphenol
- Other names p,p'-Hydroxy-DDT; Hydroxychlor; 2,2-bis(p-hydroxyphenyl)-1,1,1-trichloroethane 1,1,1-Trichloro-2,2-bis(4-hydroxyphenyl)ethane

Identifiers
CAS Number	2971-36-0
3D model (JSmol)	Interactive image
Beilstein Reference	2054671
ChEBI	CHEBI:34025
ChEMBL	ChEMBL196585
ChemSpider	68781
ECHA InfoCard	100.152.496
EC Number	623-854-1
KEGG	C14136
PubChem CID	76302
UNII	H58165YO91
CompTox Dashboard (EPA)	DTXSID8022325
- InChI: InChI=1S/C14H11Cl3O2/c15-14(16,17)13(9-1-5-11(18)6-2-9)10-3-7-12(19)8-4-10/h1-8,13,18-19H Key: IUGDILGOLSSKNE-UHFFFAOYSA-N; InChI=1S/C14H11Cl3O2/c15-14(16,17)13(9-1-5-11(18)6-2-9)10-3-7-12(19)8-4-10/h1-8,13,18-19H Key: IUGDILGOLSSKNE-UHFFFAOYSA-N
- SMILES: C1=CC(=CC=C1C(C2=CC=C(C=C2)O)C(Cl)(Cl)Cl)O

Properties
Chemical formula	C_{14}H_{11}Cl_{3}O_{2}
Molar mass	317.59 g·mol^{−1}

Hazards
- GHS labelling
Pictograms	(GHS07: Exclamation mark)
Signal word	Warning
Hazard statements	H315, H319, H335
Precautionary statements	P261, P264, P271, P280, P302+P352, P304+P340, P305+P351+P338, P312, P321, P332+P313, P337+P313, P362, P403+P233, P405, P501
- Except where otherwise noted, data are given for materials in their standard state (at 25 °C [77 °F], 100 kPa). Infobox references

HPTE, also known as hydroxychlor, p,p'-hydroxy-DDT, or 2,2-bis(4-hydroxyphenyl)-1,1,1-trichloroethane, is a metabolite of methoxychlor, a synthetic insecticide related to DDT. Like bisphenol A with similar chemical structure, HPTE is an endocrine disruptor which has estrogenic activity, and also inhibits Cholesterol side-chain cleavage enzyme (P450scc, CYP11A1) and 3α-hydroxysteroid dehydrogenase (3α-HSD).
