= Estradiol 17β-benzoate =

Chemical compound

Clinical data
- Other names: E2-17B; ZYC30
- Drug class: Estrogen; Estrogen ester

Identifiers
- IUPAC name: [(8R,9S,13S,14S,17S)-3-hydroxy-13-methyl-6,7,8,9,11,12,14,15,16,17-decahydrocyclopenta[a]phenanthren-17-yl] benzoate
- CAS Number: 983-30-2
- PubChem CID: 66420
- ChemSpider: 59794
- UNII: 3GFX41Z289
- CompTox Dashboard (EPA): DTXSID90243545

Chemical and physical data
- Formula: C_{25}H_{28}O_{3}
- Molar mass: 376.496 g·mol^{−1}
- 3D model (JSmol): Interactive image
- SMILES: C[C@]12CC[C@H]3[C@H]([C@@H]1CC[C@@H]2OC(=O)C4=CC=CC=C4)CCC5=C3C=CC(=C5)O
- InChI: InChI=1S/C25H28O3/c1-25-14-13-20-19-10-8-18(26)15-17(19)7-9-21(20)22(25)11-12-23(25)28-24(27)16-5-3-2-4-6-16/h2-6,8,10,15,20-23,26H,7,9,11-14H2,1H3/t20-,21-,22+,23+,25+/m1/s1; Key:AAGOOGMSOHOVSE-BZDYCCQFSA-N

Estradiol 17β-benzoate (E2-17B) is an estrogen and an estrogen ester—specifically, the C17β benzoate ester of estradiol—which was never marketed. It is the C17β positional isomer of the better-known and clinically used estradiol ester estradiol benzoate (estradiol 3-benzoate; Progynon-B). Estradiol 17β-benzoate was first described in the 1930s.

== See also ==
- List of estrogen esters § Estradiol esters
