= Proteins produced and secreted by the liver =

The liver plays the major role in producing proteins that are secreted into the blood, including major plasma proteins, factors in hemostasis and fibrinolysis, carrier proteins, hormones, prohormones and apolipoprotein:

== Major plasma proteins ==
All plasma proteins except Gamma-globulins are synthesised in the liver.

- Human serum albumin, osmolyte and carrier protein
- α-fetoprotein, the fetal counterpart of serum albumin
- Soluble plasma fibronectin, forming a blood clot that stops bleeding
- C-reactive protein, opsonin on microbes, acute phase protein
- Various other globulins

== Factors in hemostasis and fibrinolysis ==
- Stimulators of coagulation:
  - All factors in the coagulation cascade.
  - While the endothelium does produce some factor VIII, the majority of factor VIII is produced in the liver.
- Inhibitors of coagulation: Inactivate an enormous variety of proteinases
  - α2-macroglobulin
  - α1-antitrypsin
  - Antithrombin III
  - Protein S
  - Protein C
- Fibrinolysis: Breakdown of fibrin clots
  - Plasminogen
- Inhibitors of fibrinolysis
  - α2-antiplasmin
- Complement components C1-9, complement component 3 (C3)

== Carrier proteins ==
- Albumin, carries thyroid hormones and other hormones, particularly fat soluble ones, fatty acids to the liver, unconjugated bilirubin, many drugs and Ca^{2+}
- Ceruloplasmin, carries copper
- Transcortin, carries cortisol, aldosterone and progesterone
- Haptoglobin, carries free hemoglobin released from erythrocytes
- Hemopexin, carries free heme released from hemoglobin
- IGF binding protein, carries insulin-like growth factor 1
- Major urinary proteins, carries pheromones in rodents
- Retinol binding protein, carries retinol
- Sex hormone-binding globulin, carries sex hormones, specifically testosterone and estradiol
- Thyroxine-binding globulin, carries the thyroid hormones thyroxine (T4) and 3,5,3’-triiodothyronine (T3)
- Transthyretin, carries the thyroid hormone thyroxine (T4)
- Transferrin, carries iron ions in the ferric form (Fe^{3+})
- Vitamin D-binding protein, carries vitamin D

== Hormones ==
- FGF21, a protein hormone that induces mitochondrial oxidation of fatty acids, hepatic gluconeogenesis, and ketogenesis in response to fasting.
- Hepcidin, a peptide hormone that regulates iron homeostasis.
- Insulin-like growth factor 1, a polypeptide protein hormone which plays an important role in childhood growth and continues to have anabolic effects in adults
- Thrombopoietin, a glycoprotein hormone that regulates the production of platelets by the bone marrow

== Prohormones ==
- Angiotensinogen, when converted to angiotensin causes vasoconstriction and release of aldosterone, in effect increasing blood pressure

== Apolipoproteins ==
- Almost all apolipoprotein, except apo B48 (produced by intestine)
