= Urinary calcium =

Calcium found in urine

Urinary calcium is calcium in the urine. It is termed -calcuria or -calciuria as a suffix.

== Normal amount ==
In a urinalysis, the normal amount of urinary calcium can be measured in amount per time (commonly per 24 hours). It can also be measured in amount per mass of creatinine, which avails for estimating the urinary calcium excretion in a spot urine sample, because urinary creatinine clearance is relatively unaffected by differences in free water clearance which occurs, for example, in dehydration and which would distort the interpretation of the urinary calcium in a spot urine sample.

Normally, in an average adult, the amount of calcium excreted in the urine is 100–250 mg over a 24-hour period. For those on low-calcium diets, there is normally 50–150 mg/24 hours, while those on a calcium-free diet will have 5–40 mg/24 hours.

The following reference ranges are for persons with average calcium intake (600–800 mg/day for adults):

Individual	Lower limit	Upper limit	Unit
Females	20	275	mg calcium / 24 hours
Males	25	300	mg calcium / 24 hours
Age 0–12 months		2,100	mg calcium / g creatinine
Age 13–24 months		450	mg calcium / g creatinine
Age 25 months-5 years		350	mg calcium / g creatinine
Age 6–10 years		300	mg calcium / g creatinine
Age 11–18 years		260	mg calcium / g creatinine
Age > or =19 years		220	mg calcium / g creatinine

== Disorders ==
An abnormally high amount of urinary calcium is called hypercalciuria and an abnormally low amount is called hypocalciuria.
