= Coagulation activation marker =

Biomarkers of blood signals

Coagulation activation markers are biomarkers of net activation of coagulation and fibrinolysis. Examples include prothrombin fragment 1+2 (F1+2), thrombin–antithrombin complex (TAT), fibrinopeptide A (FpA), fibrin monomers (FMs), plasmin-α_{2}-antiplasmin complex (PAP), activated protein C–protein C inhibitor (APC-PCI), and D-dimer (DD). These compounds are markers of thrombin generation (F1+2, TAT, APC-PCI), fibrin generation (FpA, FMs), and fibrinolysis (DD, PAP). Coagulation activation markers, particularly D-dimer, are useful in the diagnosis of acute venous thromboembolism. They may also be useful in the assessment of hypercoagulability and venous thromboembolism risk.

Levels of coagulation activation markers are increased with pregnancy, with estrogen-containing birth control pills, with menopausal hormone therapy, and with high-dose parenteral estradiol therapy for prostate cancer. Transdermal estradiol appears to have less influence on coagulation activation markers than oral estrogens in menopausal hormone therapy. Birth control pills containing estradiol or estetrol also appear to have less influence on coagulation activation markers than ethinylestradiol-containing birth control pills.

Markers of platelet activation (primary hemostasis) include platelet factor 4 (PF4), β-thromboglobulin (β-TG), and P-selectin.
