= Estriol sulfate glucuronide =

Names
- IUPAC name (2S,3S,4S,5R)-3,4,5-Trihydroxy-6-{[(1S,10R,11S,13R,14R,15S)-14-hydroxy-15-methyl-5-(sulfooxy)tetracyclo[8.7.0.0^{2,7}.0^{11,15}]heptadeca-2(7),3,5-trien-13-yl]oxy}oxane-2-carboxylic acid
- Other names Estriol 3-sulfate 16α-glucuronide; 17β-Hydroxy-3-(sulfooxy)estra-1,3,5(10)-trien-16α-yl-β-D-glucopyranosiduronic acid

Identifiers
CAS Number	4661-65-8
3D model (JSmol)	Interactive image
ChemSpider	133283
PubChem CID	151223
CompTox Dashboard (EPA)	DTXSID00963621
- InChI: InChI=1S/C24H32O12S/c1-24-7-6-13-12-5-3-11(36-37(31,32)33)8-10(12)2-4-14(13)15(24)9-16(21(24)28)34-23-19(27)17(25)18(26)20(35-23)22(29)30/h3,5,8,13-21,23,25-28H,2,4,6-7,9H2,1H3,(H,29,30)(H,31,32,33)/t13-,14-,15+,16-,17+,18+,19-,20+,21+,23?,24+/m1/s1 (H,31,32,33)/t13-,14-,15+,16-,17+,18+,19-,20+,21+,23?,24+/m1/s1 Key: ATNWFRGUDKUYOG-SUPAOECSSA-N
- SMILES: [H][C@@]12C[C@@H](OC3O[C@@H]([C@@H](O)[C@H](O)[C@H]3O)C(O)=O)[C@H](O)[C@@]1(C)CC[C@]1([H])C3=C(CC[C@@]21[H])C=C(OS(O)(=O)=O)C=C3

Properties
Chemical formula	C_{24}H_{32}O_{12}S
Molar mass	544.57 g·mol^{−1}
- Except where otherwise noted, data are given for materials in their standard state (at 25 °C [77 °F], 100 kPa). Infobox references

Estriol sulfate glucuronide, or estriol 3-sulfate 16α-glucuronide, is an endogenous, naturally occurring diconjugated metabolite of estriol. It is generated in the liver from estriol sulfate by UDP-glucuronyltransferase and is eventually excreted in the urine by the kidneys. It occurs in high concentrations during pregnancy along with estriol sulfate and estriol glucuronide, and was a component of the early pharmaceutical estrogens Progynon and Emmenin.

== Formation ==
In the human liver, a glucuronosyltransferase anzyme converts estriol sulfate to its glucuronide by adding a sugar acid at one of the hydroxy groups, with uridine diphosphate (UDP) as byproduct:

estriol sulfate
+ UDP-glucuronate
UDP
estriol sulfate glucuronide

== See also ==
- Catechol estrogen
- Estrogen conjugate
- Lipoidal estrogen
