= Estriol sulfate =

Names
- IUPAC name 16α,17β-Dihydroxyestra-1,3,5(10)-trien-3-yl hydrogen sulfate
- Systematic IUPAC name (1R,2R,3aS,3bR,9bS,11aS)-1,2-Dihydroxy-11a-methyl-2,3,3a,3b,4,5,9b,10,11,11a-decahydro-1H-cyclopenta[a]phenanthren-7-yl hydrogen sulfate
- Other names Estriol 3-sulfate; Estra-1,3,5(10)-triene-3,16α,17β-triol 3-sulfate

Identifiers
CAS Number	481-95-8
3D model (JSmol)	Interactive image
ChEMBL	ChEMBL2074797
ChemSpider	59789
PubChem CID	66415
UNII	LZ7JHK6R2A
CompTox Dashboard (EPA)	DTXSID50963999
- InChI: InChI=1S/C18H24O6S/c1-18-7-6-13-12-5-3-11(24-25(21,22)23)8-10(12)2-4-14(13)15(18)9-16(19)17(18)20/h3,5,8,13-17,19-20H,2,4,6-7,9H2,1H3,(H,21,22,23)/t13-,14-,15+,16-,17+,18+/m1/s1 Key: ZORQMBLUMWNJEQ-ZXXIGWHRSA-N
- SMILES: C[C@]12CC[C@H]3[C@H]([C@@H]1C[C@H]([C@@H]2O)O)CCC4=C3C=CC(=C4)OS(=O)(=O)O

Properties
Chemical formula	C_{18}H_{24}O_{6}S
Molar mass	368.44 g·mol^{−1}
- Except where otherwise noted, data are given for materials in their standard state (at 25 °C [77 °F], 100 kPa). Infobox references

Estriol sulfate, or estriol 3-sulfate, is a conjugated metabolite of estriol that is present in high quantities during pregnancy. It is formed from estriol in the liver and is eventually excreted in the urine by the kidneys. It has much higher water solubility than does estriol. Estriol sulfate is the second most prevalent conjugated metabolite of estriol during pregnancy; 35 to 46% is estriol glucuronide and 15 to 22% is estriol 3-sulfate, while the double conjugate estriol sulfate glucuronide also occurs. Estriol sulfate was a component, along with estriol glucuronide, of the early pharmaceutical estrogens Progynon and Emmenin.

== See also ==
- Catechol estrogen
- Estradiol glucuronide
- Estradiol sulfate
- Estrogen conjugate
- Estrone glucuronide
- Estrone sulfate
- Lipoidal estradiol
