= Progynon Depot =

Progynon Depot may refer to:

- Estradiol valerate
- Estradiol undecylate

== See also ==
- Progynon
