= Fibrin monomer =

Macromolecular complex found in Homo sapiens

Fibrin monomers are monomers of fibrin which are formed by the cleavage of fibrinogen by thrombin. Levels of fibrin monomers can be measured using blood tests and can serve as a marker of in vivo fibrinogenesis and coagulation activation. They may be useful in the evaluation of hypercoagulability, as reflected in research studies done using fibrin monomers.

Levels of fibrin monomers may be increased with pregnancy and by estrogen-containing combined birth control pills.

== Research ==
=== Significance in venous thromboembolism ===
Increased amount of soluble fibrin monomers in the blood along with serum D-dimers have been found to be indicators of venous thromboembolism (VTE). Detection of VTE in such a way have implications for treating VTE taking place during pregnancy and after hepatobiliary-pancreatic surgery.
