= Prothrombin fragment 1+2 =

Prothrombin fragment 1+2 (F1+2), also written as prothrombin fragment 1.2 (F1.2), is a polypeptide fragment of prothrombin (factor II) generated by the in vivo cleavage of prothrombin into thrombin (factor IIa) by the enzyme prothrombinase (a complex of factor Xa and factor Va). It is released from the N-terminus of prothrombin. F1+2 is a marker of thrombin generation and hence of coagulation activation. It is considered the best marker of in vivo thrombin generation.

F1+2 levels can be quantified with blood tests and is used in the diagnosis of hyper- and hypocoagulable states and in the monitoring of anticoagulant therapy. It was initially determined with a radioimmunoassay, but is now measured with several enzyme-linked immunosorbent assays.

The molecular weight of F1+2 is around 41 to 43 kDa. Its biological half-life is 90 minutes and it persists in blood for a few hours after formation. The half-life of F1+2 is relatively long, which makes it more reliable for measuring ongoing coagulation than other markers like thrombin–antithrombin complexes and fibrinopeptide A. Concentrations of F1+2 in healthy individuals range from 0.44 to 1.11 nM.

F1+2 levels increase with age. Levels of F1+2 have been reported to be elevated in venous thromboembolism, protein C deficiency, protein S deficiency, atrial fibrillation, unstable angina, acute myocardial infarction, acute stroke, atherosclerosis, peripheral arterial disease, and in smokers. Anticoagulants have been found to reduce F1+2 levels. F1+2 levels are increased with pregnancy and by ethinylestradiol-containing birth control pills. Conversely, they do not appear to be increased with estetrol- or estradiol-containing birth control pills. However, F1+2 levels have been reported to be increased with oral estrogen-based menopausal hormone therapy, whereas transdermal estradiol-based menpausal hormone therapy appears to result in less or no consistent increase.
