= Estrogenic substances =

Estrogen medication

- Estrone, a major ingredient in estrogenic substances

Combination of
- Estrone: Estrogen
- 17β-Estradiol: Estrogen
- Equilin: Estrogen

Clinical data
- Trade names: Amniotin, Estrogenic Hormones, Estrogenic Substances, Estrolin, Estromone, Folestrin, Follacro, Menformon, Oestroform, Ova-Estrin, Theelestrin, others
- Other names: Natural estrogens; Estrone-like preparations
- Routes of administration: By mouth (tablets, capsules), topical (ointment), vaginal (suppository), intramuscular injection (oil solution)
- Drug class: Estrogen

Legal status
- Legal status: US: ℞-only

Estrogenic substances, also referred to as natural estrogens and sold under the brand name Amniotin among others, is an estrogen medication which was marketed in the 1930s and 1940s and is no longer available. It was a purified extract of animal material such as horse urine, placenta, and/or amniotic fluid, and contained a non-crystalline mixture of estrogens, including estrone, 17β-estradiol, 17α-estradiol, and/or equilin. The medication was thought to contain estrone as its major active ingredient and was described as an estrone-like preparation, or as "essentially estrone". Estrogenic substances was originally produced from the urine of pregnant women, placenta, and/or amniotic fluid, but by the early 1940s, it was manufactured exclusively from the urine of stallions or pregnant mares, similarly to almost all other estrogen preparations on the market.

Estrogenic substances was marketed under a variety of different brand names including Amniotin (Squibb), Equine Estrogenic Substances (Ayerst), Estrogenic Hormones (Upjohn, others), Estrogenic Substances (Reed & Carnrick, Sharp & Dohme, others), Estrolin (Lakeside), Estromone, Estronat (National Drug), Folestrin (Armour), Follacro (Schieffelin), Menformon (Roche-Organon), Neo-Amniotin (Squibb), Oestroform, Ova-Estrin, Theelestrin, and Urestrin (Upjohn), among others. It was provided in various forms and routes of administration including oil solution and aqueous suspension for intramuscular injection, oral tablets and capsules, vaginal suppositories, and topical ointments.

Estrogen medications similar to but distinct from estrogenic substances included conjugated estriol (Emmenin) and conjugated estrogens (Premarin). They are also non-crystalline mixtures of estrogens. Estrogenic substances were also distinct from pure crystalline preparations such as estrone, estradiol, estriol, estradiol benzoate, and estradiol dipropionate. The medication should additionally be distinguished from estrogen ovarian extracts, which had little activity and were considered to be essentially inactive.

Progynon and Amniotin were both marketed by 1929. Amniotin was originally prepared from the amniotic fluid of cattle, but was later prepared using other sources such as the urine of pregnant mares.
