= Conjugated estriol =

Pharmaceutical drug

- Estriol 16α-glucuronide, the primary active component in conjugated estriol (estriol glucuronides constitute about 35 to 46% of total content).

- Estriol 3-sulfate, the second major active component in conjugated estriol (constitutes about 15 to 22% of total content).

Combination of
- Estriol glucuronide: Estrogen
- Estriol sulfate: Estrogen
- Estriol sulfate glucuronide: Estrogen

Clinical data
- Trade names: Progynon, Emmenin
- Other names: Conjugated human estriol; Conjugated oestriol; Conjugated human oestriol; CE3; CHE3; Conjugated human estrogens; Conjugated human oestrogens; CHEs
- Routes of administration: By mouth

Identifiers
- CAS Number: 113-38-2
- UNII: NIG5418BXB

Conjugated estriol, sold under the brand names Progynon and Emmenin, is an estrogen medication which was previously used for estrogen-type indications such as the treatment of menopausal symptoms in women. The term specifically refers to formulations of estriol conjugates which were manufactured from the estrogen-rich urine of pregnant women and were used as medications in the 1920s and 1930s. Conjugated estriol is analogous to and was superseded by conjugated estrogens (brand name Premarin), which is manufactured from the urine of pregnant mares. Conjugated estriol was among the first forms of pharmaceutical estrogen to be used in medicine. It was taken by mouth.

The main components of conjugated estriol are estriol glucuronides and to a lesser extent estriol sulfates. Estrogen glucuronides can be deglucuronidated into the corresponding free estrogens by β-glucuronidase in tissues that express this enzyme, such as the mammary gland, liver, and kidney, among others. Likewise, estrogen sulfates can be desulfated into the corresponding free estrogens by steroid sulfatase in tissues that express this enzyme. Consequently, estrogen conjugates have estrogenic activity via conversion into unconjugated estrogens.

== Progynon ==
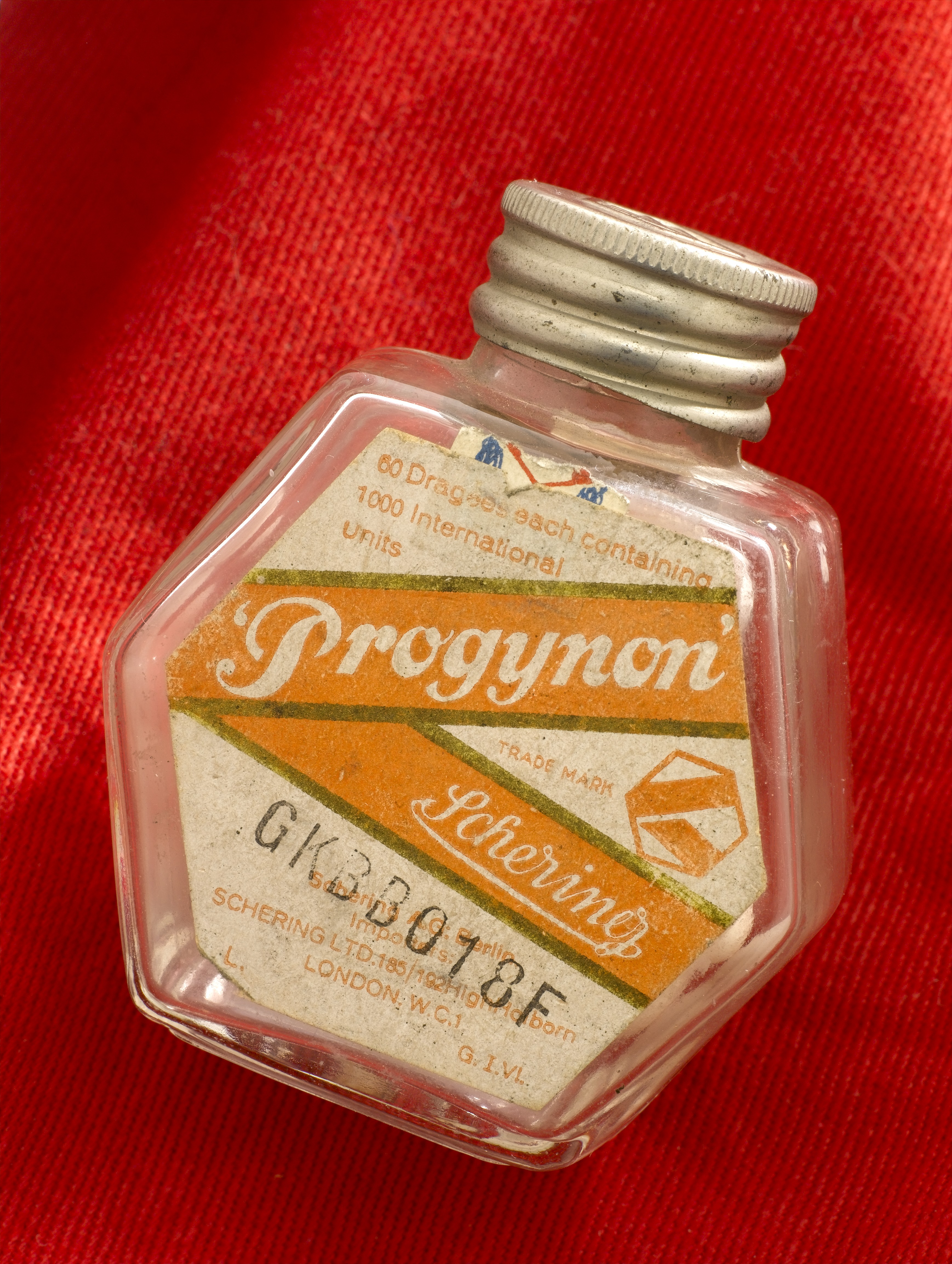
Progynon (Schering).

Progynon was an orally active formulation of estrogen that was developed by Adolf Butenandt at Schering and introduced in Germany in 1928. It was reportedly the first sex hormone product and hence also the first estrogen product to be introduced for medical use. Progynon was originally an ovarian or placental extract, but Schering soon switched for economic reasons to using the urine of women who were in late pregnancy. This form of Progynon was essentially the same product as Emmenin, which was developed by James Collip at Ayerst and introduced in Canada in 1930 (and in the U.S. in 1934).

To further reduce the costs of manufacturing Progynon, Schering eventually switched to using the urine of pregnant mares and called its new product Progynon 2. Ayerst followed suit, with the introduction of Premarin (conjugated equine estrogens) in 1941. Premarin soon superseded Emmenin and has since become not only a very widely used estrogen, but one of the most widely prescribed drugs in North America.

Both Progynon and Emmenin contained a mixture of water-soluble estrogens, which was determined later to be mostly estriol glucuronide. Conjugates of estriol like estriol glucuronide and estriol sulfate constitute more than 90% of the estrogens in the urine of pregnant women. Of these conjugates, 35 to 46% are estriol glucuronides and 15 to 22% are estriol 3-sulfate in late pregnancy; the double conjugate estriol sulfate glucuronide (probably estriol 3-sulfate 16α-glucuronide) also occurs.

Progynon was also the name that Butenandt originally gave estrone (which he had isolated in 1929) in his first publication on the substance (and later referred to as folliculine, with the name estrone not finally being adopted until 1935). Aside from Progynon and Progynon 2, the Progynon name has also been used in a variety of other estrogenic products marketed by Schering, including Progynon-B (estradiol benzoate), Progynon-DH (estradiol; "dihydroxyestrin"), Progynon-DP (estradiol dipropionate), Progynon-C (ethinylestradiol), Progynova (estradiol valerate), and Progynon Depot (estradiol valerate, estradiol undecylate).

== Emmenin ==
Emmenin (Ayerst).

Emmenin was an orally active formulation of estrogen that was developed by James Collip at Ayerst and introduced in Canada in 1930 and the United States in 1934. It was originally an extract obtained from human placenta. At some point, it seems to have been changed to an extract of the urine of women who were in late pregnancy, which was equivalent in composition but was less expensive to source, and was essentially the same product as Progynon, a related estrogen developed by Adolf Butenandt at Schering and introduced in Germany. These estrogen products were the first orally active estrogens to be marketed for medical use.

To reduce the costs of manufacturing Emmenin and Progynon, Ayerst and Schering eventually switched to using the urine of pregnant mares (which contains conjugated equine estrogens, primarily estrone sulfate) and called their new products Premarin and Progynon 2, respectively. Premarin was introduced by Ayerst in 1941 and has become not only a very widely used estrogen, but one of the most widely prescribed drugs in North America.

Both Emmenin and Progynon contained a mixture of water-soluble conjugated estrogens, later determined to be mostly estriol glucuronide. Conjugates of estriol like estriol glucuronide and estriol sulfate constitute more than 90% of the estrogens in the urine of pregnant women. Of these conjugates, 35 to 46% are estriol glucuronides and 15 to 22% are estriol 3-sulfate in late pregnancy; the double conjugate estriol sulfate glucuronide (probably estriol 3-sulfate 16α-glucuronide) also occurs. Unlike unconjugated estrogens like estradiol and estrone, these estrogens were orally active.

== See also ==
- Estrogenic substances
- Conjugated estrogens
- Esterified estrogens
- Estrogen conjugate
- List of combined sex-hormonal preparations
