= Estradiol 3-glucuronide 17β-sulfate =

Names
- IUPAC name 17β-(Sulfooxy)estra-1,3,5(10)-trien-3-yl β-D-glucopyranosiduronic acid
- Systematic IUPAC name (2S,3S,4S,5R,6S)-3,4,5-Trihydroxy-6-{[(1S,3aS,3bR,9bS,11aS)-11a-methyl-1-(sulfooxy)-2,3,3a,3b,4,5,9b,10,11,11a-decahydro-1H-cyclopenta[a]phenanthren-7-yl]oxy}oxane-2-carboxylic acid
- Other names E2-3G-17S

Identifiers
CAS Number	84123-28-4
3D model (JSmol)	Interactive image
ChEBI	CHEBI:79720
ChemSpider	10128415
KEGG	C15207
PubChem CID	11954120
CompTox Dashboard (EPA)	DTXSID901336469
- InChI: InChI=1S/C24H32O11S/c1-24-9-8-14-13-5-3-12(33-23-20(27)18(25)19(26)21(34-23)22(28)29)10-11(13)2-4-15(14)16(24)6-7-17(24)35-36(30,31)32/h3,5,10,14-21,23,25-27H,2,4,6-9H2,1H3,(H,28,29)(H,30,31,32)/t14-,15-,16+,17+,18+,19+,20-,21+,23-,24+/m1/s1 Key: XZXBPAODZJETKT-QXYWQCSFSA-N
- SMILES: C[C@]12CC[C@H]3[C@H]([C@@H]1CC[C@@H]2OS(=O)(=O)O)CCC4=C3C=CC(=C4)O[C@H]5[C@@H]([C@H]([C@@H]([C@H](O5)C(=O)O)O)O)O

Properties
Chemical formula	C_{24}H_{32}O_{11}S
Molar mass	528.57 g·mol^{−1}
- Except where otherwise noted, data are given for materials in their standard state (at 25 °C [77 °F], 100 kPa). Infobox references

Estradiol 3-glucuronide 17β-sulfate (E2-3G-17S) is an endogenous estrogen conjugate and metabolite of estradiol. It is related to estradiol 3-sulfate and estradiol 17β-glucuronide. Estradiol 3-glucuronide 17β-sulfate has 0.0001% of the relative binding affinity of estradiol for the ERα, one of the two estrogen receptors (ERs). It shows less than one million-fold lower potency in activating the estrogen receptors relative to estradiol in vitro.

== See also ==
- Catechol estrogen
- Estrogen conjugate
- Lipoidal estradiol
- List of estrogen esters § Estradiol esters
