= Ayerst =

Ayerst is a surname. Notable people with the surname include:

- Fiona Ayerst (born 1965), South African photographer
- Peter Ayerst (1920–2014), Royal Air force officer
- William Ayerst (1830–1904), British clergyman and missionary
- William Ayerst Ingram (1855–1913), British painter
