= Plasmin-α2-antiplasmin complex =

Plasmin-α2-antiplasmin complex (PAP) is a 1:1 irreversibly formed inactive complex of the enzyme plasmin and its inhibitor α_{2}-antiplasmin. It is a marker of the activity of the fibrinolytic system and a marker of net activation of fibrinolysis. Excess of the PAP complex can lead to abnormal bleeding due to enhanced clot lysis leading to a hyperfibrinolytic state. The PAP complex can be useful in the determining the prognosis of a clot, but it is limited because it is measured using ELISA.

== Various uses of PAP as a marker ==
Low PAP levels can be indicative that patients with a past myocardial infarction have a higher risk of another coronary event within the following 2 years. Specifically, when PAP levels are less than 100 ng/ml there was an associated 2.2-fold increase in the risk for another coronary event. When the cut off is less than 100 there is a 5-fold increase in risk. This marker is useful in the clinical setting as a potential way to identify patients that are at higher risk. However, there was not a significant difference between the PAP levels of patients that were on anticoagulative therapy versus patients that were not on anticoagulative therapy. PAP is an independent marker for the risk of another coronary event post-MI, as the risk analysis remained constant when confounding factors (e.g. age, sex, BMI, smoking history, etc.) were controlled for.

PAP levels are increased with pregnancy and by ethinylestradiol-containing combined birth control pills. Conversely, levels of PAP do not appear to be affected with menopausal hormone therapy. PAP levels have been reported to be elevated in men with prostate cancer. PAP can be useful in predicting if a patient is at high risk for a perioperative pulmonary embolism.
