= Estriol glucuronide =

Chemical compound

Clinical data
- Other names: Estriol glucuronidate; (16α,17β)-16,17-Dihydroxyestra-1,3,5(10)-trien-3-yl D-glucopyranosiduronic acid; β-D-Glucopyranuronic acid, monoglycoside with (16α,17β)-estra-1,3,5(10)-triene-3,16,17-triol
- Routes of administration: By mouth

Identifiers
- IUPAC name: (2S,3S,4S,5R,6R)-6-[[(8R,9S,13S,14S,16R,17R)-3,17-dihydroxy-13-methyl-6,7,8,9,11,12,14,15,16,17-decahydrocyclopenta[a]phenanthren-16-yl]oxy]-3,4,5-trihydroxyoxane-2-carboxylic acid
- CAS Number: 28808-07-3
- PubChem CID: 122281
- ChemSpider: 134818
- CompTox Dashboard (EPA): DTXSID30939935
- ECHA InfoCard: 100.161.795

Chemical and physical data
- Formula: C_{24}H_{32}O_{9}
- Molar mass: 464.511 g·mol^{−1}
- 3D model (JSmol): Interactive image
- SMILES: C[C@]12CC[C@H]3[C@H]([C@@H]1C[C@H]([C@@H]2O)O[C@H]4[C@@H]([C@H]([C@@H]([C@H](O4)C(=O)O)O)O)O)CCC5=C3C=CC(=C5)O
- InChI: InChI=1S/C24H32O9/c1-24-7-6-13-12-5-3-11(25)8-10(12)2-4-14(13)15(24)9-16(21(24)29)32-23-19(28)17(26)18(27)20(33-23)22(30)31/h3,5,8,13-21,23,25-29H,2,4,6-7,9H2,1H3,(H,30,31)/t13-,14-,15+,16-,17+,18+,19-,20+,21+,23-,24+/m1/s1; Key:FQYGGFDZJFIDPU-JRSYHJKYSA-N

Estriol glucuronide (E3G), or oestriol glucuronide, also known as estriol monoglucuronide, as well as estriol 16α-β-D-glucosiduronic acid, is a natural, steroidal estrogen and the glucuronic acid (β-D-glucopyranuronic acid) conjugate of estriol.

estriol
+ UDP-glucuronate
UDP
estriol glucuronide

== Formation ==
Estriol glucuronide occurs in high concentrations in the urine of pregnant women as a reversibly formed metabolite of estriol produced by glucuronosyltransferase enzymes. Estriol glucuronide is a prodrug of estriol, and was the major component of Progynon and Emmenin, estrogenic products manufactured from the urine of pregnant women that were introduced in the 1920s and 1930s and were the first orally active estrogens. Emmenin was succeeded by Premarin (conjugated equine estrogens), which is sourced from the urine of pregnant mares and was introduced in 1941. Premarin replaced Emmenin because it was easier and less expensive to produce.

Estrogen glucuronides can be deglucuronidated into the corresponding free estrogens by β-glucuronidase in tissues that express this enzyme, such as the mammary gland. As a result, estrogen glucuronides have estrogenic activity via conversion into estrogens.

The positional isomer of estriol 16α-glucuronide, estriol 3-glucuronide, also occurs as an endogenous metabolite of estriol, although to a much lower extent in comparison.

== See also ==
- Catechol estrogen
- Estradiol glucuronide
- Estradiol sulfate
- Estrogen conjugate
- Estrone glucuronide
- Estrone sulfate
- Lipoidal estradiol
