= Thrombin–antithrombin complex =

Thrombin–antithrombin complex (TAT) is a protein complex of thrombin and antithrombin. It is a marker of net activation of coagulation.

== Formation and elimination ==
TAT is formed in response to the high thrombin level caused by coagulation following a ruptured vessel. Since thrombin is rapidly bound by antithrombin, TAT is a useful measure for thrombin level in the blood. Thrombin can pass the blood–brain barrier, destroying neurons and potentially causing cerebral edemas.

The half-life of TAT is approximately 15 minutes.

== Disease ==
=== Cerebral hemorrhage ===
TAT levels were studied in patients with intracranial blood clot removal within 24 hours after intracerebral hemorrhage (ICH) in Fujian from 2006 to 2008. This study revealed that TAT levels in the plasma and hematoma fluid of these patients are higher than that those of healthy people, and that TAT levels decreased in the patients after surgery and increased in the patients that had a hemorrhage again. The TAT levels correlate with the severity of ICH according to GCS and NIHSS, and so, the study concluded that TAT complex may be useful in the prognosis for post-operative ICH-patients.

== Influences ==
TAT levels are increased with pregnancy and by ethinylestradiol-containing birth control pills. They have also been reported to be increased by menopausal hormone therapy, although findings are mixed, and with high-dose parenteral estradiol therapy for prostate cancer.
