= Lipoidal estradiol =

Class of chemical compounds

Estradiol stearate, one of the estradiol esters that represents lipoidal estradiol.

Lipoidal estradiol (LE2) is the variety of endogenous C17β long-chain fatty acid esters of estradiol which are formed as metabolites of estradiol. Important examples of these esters include estradiol arachidonate, estradiol lineolate, estradiol oleate, estradiol palmitate, and estradiol stearate. LE2 are estrogens but do not bind to the estrogen receptor, instead acting as prohormones of estradiol. Relative to estradiol, they have far longer-lasting durations of effect due to their much slower rates of metabolism and clearance. It has been hypothesized that LE2 may serve as a store of estrogen for when estradiol levels become low. LE2 are highly lipophilic and hydrophobic and are found in highest concentrations in adipose tissue and other estrogen-sensitive tissues and in low but detectable concentrations in circulation, with none excreted in urine. They have been referred to as the "endogenous counterparts of the synthetic esters of estrogens" like estradiol valerate and estradiol cypionate.

Two of the estradiol esters that compose LE2, estradiol palmitate and estradiol stearate, have been developed and marketed for medical use as long-acting estrogens for use via depot intramuscular injection.

Estradiol is esterified into LE2 by lecithin–cholesterol acyltransferase (LCAT).

== See also ==
- Catechol estrogen
- Estradiol stearate
- Estradiol undecylate
- Estrogen conjugate
- Steroid sulfate
