= Alastair MacLennan (obstetrician) =

Scottish-Australian obstetrician, researcher, and health advocate (born 1945)

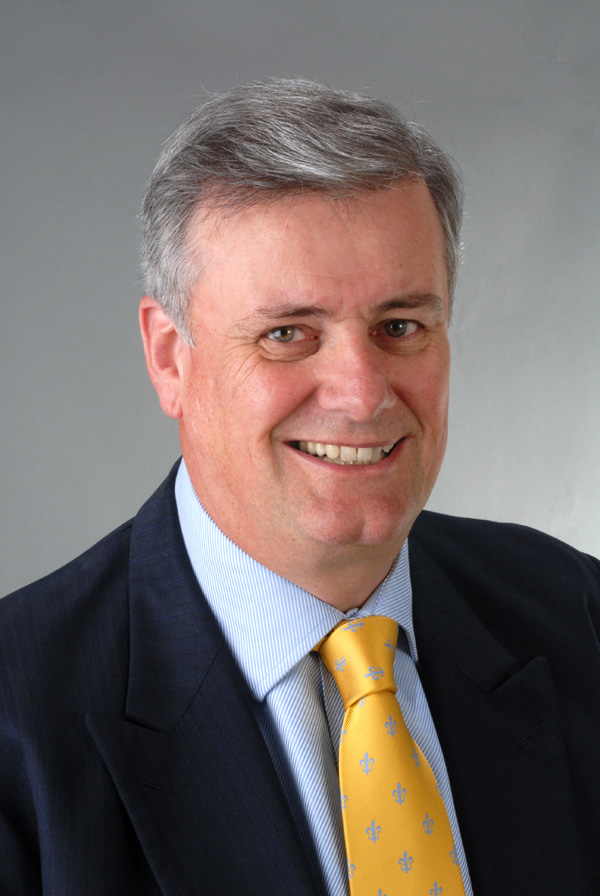
- Born: 28 March 1945 (age 81); Glasgow, Scotland
- Education: MB, ChB, MD (Glasgow)
- Known for: Evidence-based medicine
- Relatives: Alice MacLennan (late spouse)
- Medical career
- Profession: Emeritus Professor of Medicine
- Field: Obstetrics and gynaecology
- Institutions: University of Adelaide; Robinson Research Institute; Women's and Children's Hospital
- Research: Menopause, cerebral palsy
- Website: https://www.adelaide.edu.au/directory/alastair.maclennan

Alastair Harvey MacLennan, AO (born 28 March 1945) is a Scottish-Australian obstetrician, professor of obstetrics and gynaecology, medical researcher, and a community health advocate. He studied and practised medicine in Glasgow, Chicago, and Oxford before moving to Australia in 1977 to take up a position at the University of Adelaide, where he went on to become the Professor and Head of the Discipline of Obstetrics and Gynaecology in 2006. He retired from his full-time academic position in 2013, and he is now emeritus professor of medicine. He leads research projects at the Robinson Research Institute, and he is Head of the university's Cerebral Palsy Research Group.

His research has focused on foetal growth restriction, prematurity, parturition, and menopausal medicine. His current research investigates the causes of cerebral palsy, especially dispelling the myth that it is caused by oxygen deprivation or difficulties during birth.

He is a founding member of the Friends of Science in Medicine. He was appointed an Officer of the Order of Australia for his services to medicine as a practitioner, a researcher, and a teacher.

== Early life and education ==
MacLennan was born in Glasgow, Scotland, on 28 March 1945. In an interview, he said that he wanted to be a doctor since he was four years old. At age 16, he began studying at the University of Glasgow Medical School, mentored by Ian Donald, who pioneered obstetric ultrasound. He graduated in 1968 with a MB ChB, choosing to specialise in obstetrics and gynaecology because it incorporates being both a physician and a surgeon, with a variety of sub-specialities and research opportunities.

== Medical career ==
In 1970, MacLennan started as a Research Fellow at the University of Illinois at Chicago, describing the menstrual cycle and placentogenesis of the baboon. He then spent five years at Oxford University and its John Radcliffe Hospital as a lecturer in Obstetrics and Gynaecology from 1972 to 1977. He was also a Visiting Associate Professor at the University of California, San Francisco (UCSF) studying “The role of the hormone Relaxin on human reproduction” which is the title of his MD thesis (University of Glasgow, awarded 1985).

In 1977, MacLennan was invited to move to Adelaide, Australia by Professor Lloyd Cox, who was Australia's first reproductive endocrinologist and the foundation professor of obstetrics and gynaecology at the University of Adelaide. He moved to Australia to take up a position as a Senior Lecturer at the University of Adelaide, initially for a term of three years, and he remained there as a clinical academic for over 40 years. From 1986 to 1999, he headed the University of Adelaide Obstetric Clinic and Menopause Clinic. He became the professor and head of the discipline of obstetrics and gynaecology in 2006, a position which he held until his retirement in 2012. Since 1977, he has also been a Senior Visiting Specialist at the Women and Children's Hospital in Adelaide, and at the Queen Victoria Hospital until it closed in 1989.

His research projects, funded by grants from the NHMRC, the Cerebral Palsy Foundation, and The Tenix Foundation (2010–2017), investigated foetal growth restriction, prematurity, parturition, and cerebral palsy – especially disproving the previously widespread belief that it is caused by oxygen deprivation due to delivery problems. In 2013, the Cerebral Palsy Alliance's Research Foundation provided his team with a grant of AU$800,000 to help establish an Australian Cerebral Palsy Biobank. He leads the Australian Collaborative Cerebral Palsy Research Group, investigating the roles that genetic susceptibility and environmental triggers have in cerebral palsy.

After retiring from his full-time academic position, he remains on the emeritus staff of the Robinson Institute, where his research team challenged the myth that cerebral palsy is usually due to lack of oxygen at birth. Their research identified that genetic causes, rather than oxygen deprivation or other delivery issues, were the primary cause of cerebral palsy. In May 2018 they announced the results of a large-scale genetic study which identified disruptions in RNA signalling and inflammatory pathways that are common to children with cerebral palsy and autism. He is Head of the Cerebral Palsy Research Group in the university's Paediatrics and Reproductive Health unit.

His gynaecological specialty was menopausal medicine. Researching postmenopausal hormone therapy, he ran the second-largest randomised trial globally.

His service to professional organizations include chairing the International Expert Task Forces and Consensus Statements on Cerebral Palsy in 1995, 1999 and 2003; founding member and past president of the Perinatal Society of Australia and New Zealand; chief Australian Investigator of the Women's International Study on Long Duration Oestrogen after Menopause ("WISDOM"); founding member and past president of the Australasian Menopause Society. He has served as an examiner for Melbourne University, Sydney University, Australian Medical Council, Australian College of Midwives, and the Royal Australian and New Zealand College of Obstetricians and Gynaecologists.

He has published over 350 papers in peer-reviewed scientific journals and five books. He served as editor-in-chief of Maturitas (journal of the European Menopause and Andropause Society) for ten years, and founding editor-in-chief of Climacteric (journal of the International Menopause Society). He and his late wife Dr Alice MacLennan co-wrote the book "Menopause: Presenting a Positive Outlook", which is in its 20th edition. They also made more than 30 videos on related topics in English, Indonesian, Japanese and Filipino.

== Community engagement ==
In addition to his formal academic roles, MacLennan has championed evidence-based medicine and educating the general public. He has challenged alternative health practices to show evidence that they are safe and effective. His initial focus was on the damage caused by chiropractic treatment to new-born babies, and the abuse of non-prescription hormone replacement substitutes. He estimated that in Australia in 2000, AU$2.3 billion was spent on visits to complementary practitioners or use of complementary medicines. He expressed particular concern about the lack of understanding in the general public: his longitudinal study in 2004 observed that "the public is often unaware that CAMs are not tested by the Therapeutic Goods Administration for efficacy or safety" – on the contrary, his studies found that most Australian consumers believe that alternative preparations have been tested to determine whether they are safe or effective, when they have not.

MacLennan is vice-president of the "Friends of Science in Medicine" (FSM), which he jointly founded in 2011. The University of Adelaide described FSM as "a public health watch dog group of distinguished lay members, scientists and health professionals who are concerned about honesty in medical claims and the need for evidence-based medicine particularly in the growing alternative therapy industry".

MacLennan has engaged with universities to discourage them from teaching subjects which are not supported by evidence as if they were science. In 2011, he identified 17 universities that offered "degrees in quackery", and he approached them to show how this undermines those universities' credibility. He used a 2016 graduation address to warn the new graduates about the pressure they would experience to promote therapies that were not based on evidence, and that "they should not be seduced into the lucrative but unproven and therefore untenable amalgam of traditional medicine and pseudoscientific alternate practices." In 2018, he strongly criticized courses endorsed by the Australian College of Midwives that promote unproven practices including moxibustion and acupressure to reposition a breech baby, claiming they pose a direct risk to the mothers and babies.

His criticisms also extended to some aspects of conventional medical practice, especially the rapid increase in unnecessary testing, advising students "don’t order a test if it is not going to change your management."

He serves on the Board of the Channel 7 Children's Research Foundation, which distributes money for children's medical research.

== Awards and recognition ==
In the 2011 Australia Day honours, MacLennan was appointed an Officer of the Order of Australia (AO) in recognition of his distinguished service to medicine in the fields of obstetrics and gynaecology, his research into the causes of cerebral palsy, and his contributions to medical education and to professional development.

He is a Fellow of the Royal College of Obstetricians and Gynaecologists (FRCOG), a Member of the Royal College of Obstetricians and Gynaecologists (MRCOG), a Fellow of the Royal Microscopical Society and a Fellow of the Royal Australian and New Zealand College of Obstetricians and Gynaecologists (FRANZCOG). The University of Adelaide appointed him as an Emeritus Professor in 2013 to recognise his distinguished service to the university.

MacLennan has been awarded Honorary Life Memberships for his distinguished service to the Australian and New Zealand Menopause Society, International Menopause Society, Perinatal Society of Australia and New Zealand, and the Australian Society for Psychosocial Obstetrics and Gynaecology:

Other awards and recognitions include:

- 1998 – Alastair MacLennan and his wife Dr Alice MacLennan were jointly awarded the Australasian Menopause Society's Lifetime Achievement Award.
- 2001 – Novartis Menopause Award, which was presented and judged by the Australasian Menopause Society for the best publication in the field of women's health in the past year.
- 2006 – He gave the 2006 Healthy Development Adelaide Oration entitled "Who will deliver the next generation? Cerebral Palsy Causation and litigation".
- 2006 – Healthy Development Adelaide Award for his research into Women's and Children's Health.
- 2008 – The University of Adelaide Discipline of Obstetrics and Gynaecology presented him the award for the most outstanding paper (with the most potential to impact clinical practice).
- 2009 – Rear Admiral Kevin Scarce, the Governor of South Australia, awarded MacLennan the Science Excellence Award for Public Good "in recognition of his work in cerebral palsy and other reproductive health research".
- 2009 – The Australian Society for Psychosocial Obstetrics and Gynaecology awarded MacLennan the Roger Wurm Award at their annual scientific meeting for the best overall scientific presentation.
- 2010 – He was awarded the Arthur Wilson Orator's medal for his address at the Royal Australian and New Zealand College of Obstetricians and Gynaecologists Annual Scientific Meeting in Adelaide, entitled The Ascent of Woman From Queen Adelaide to Queen Camilla, in which he discussed the history and evolution of women and reproductive health.
- 2011 - He was awarded the "Professor Derek Frewin Excellence in student teaching Award" by the University of Adelaide.
- 2012 - MacLennan and the co-founding members of FSM were jointly named as the "Skeptics of the Year" by the Australian Skeptics Inc.
- 2021 - awarded the Distinguished Service Medal of The Royal Australian and New Zealand College of Obstetricians and Gynaecologists "for the significant contribution Alistair has made to women’s health over many years" and in particular his "ground-breaking research into the causes of cerebral palsy and the contributions this work has had on the practice of Obstetrics".

== Published books ==
- Quinn MA; MacLennan AH; Jakubowicz DL (1988). Spontaneous and induced labour: Current Concepts. East Melbourne: RACOG Publications. ISBN 978-0-959372-95-3.
- MacLennan AH; MacLennan A (2009) [First edition 1991]. Presenting a positive outlook on the menopause (19th ed.). Wyeth Ayerst.
- MacLennan AH; Tregear GW; Bryant-Greenwood GD (1995). Progress in Relaxin Research. Singapore: Global Publications. ISBN 978-9-813049-02-4.
- MacLennan AH; Sturdee DW (2008). The Menopause Debate. Singapore: Saunders Elsevier.
- MacLennan AH (2014). Neonatal encephalopathy and neurologic outcome (Second ed.). American College of Obstetricians and Gynecologists, American Academy of Pediatrics. ISBN 978-1-934984-30-7.

== Personal life ==
While studying at the University of Glasgow, Alastair met and married Alice MacLennan, who also qualified as a doctor. She became a Clinical Senior Lecturer at the University of Adelaide, Chair of the Council of Affiliated Menopause Societies from 2005 until 2008, and was awarded a Medal of the Order of Australia (OAM) in 2012 for her work in women's reproductive health. Alice died of cancer on 10 September 2015.

The MacLennans had two daughters, Suzanna (born 1974) and Lorna (born 1976), both of whom were born while the couple lived at Oxford. Lorna's birth came earlier than expected, and Alastair delivered her at home.
