= Angelica Lindén Hirschberg =

Swedish obstetrician and gynecologist

- Occupations: Obstetrician, gynecologist and academic

Academic background
- Education: MD; PhD
- Alma mater: Karolinska Institutet
- Thesis: Role of cholecystokinin in feeding and lactation (1989)

Academic work
- Institutions: Karolinska Institutet

Angelica Lindén Hirschberg is a Swedish obstetrician, gynecologist and academic. She is a professor in Obstetrics and Gynecology at Karolinska Institutet, Senior Consultant in the Department of Gynecology and Reproductive Medicine and the Head of Women's Health Research Unit at the Karolinska University Hospital.

Hirschberg's research focuses on improving diagnosis, fertility, and long-term health for women with reproductive challenges linked to strenuous exercise, obesity, polyendocrine metabolic ovarian syndrome (PMOS), premature ovarian insufficiency (POI), and differences of sex development (DSD), by investigating their reproductive and gonadal development through translational studies and clinical trials. Furthermore, she studies important aspects of women's health including menopause and sexuality. She is the recipient of the 2016 Grand Prize in Sport Science and the 2018 Swedish King's Seraphim Medal. Additionally, she is the President of the European Menopause and Andropause Society, and an Editor of the journal Maturitas.

== Education and early career ==
Hirschberg earned an MD and PhD from the Karolinska Institutet in 1984 and 1989, respectively.

== Career ==
Hirschberg began her academic career as an associate professor in Experimental Obstetrics and Gynecology at the Karolinska Institutet in 1995. She was appointed Adjunct University Lecturer at Karolinska Institutet, where she has been serving as a professor in Obstetrics and Gynecology since 2007.

Hirschberg has been and the Director of Doctoral Studies since 2018 at Karolinska Institutet.

Hirschberg was a Resident at Karolinska Hospital from 1993 to 2000 and was appointed Specialist in Obstetrics and Gynecology in 2000. In 2001, she became the Official Gynecologist of the Swedish Olympic Committee (SOC), and subsequently became the Medical Expert in the Swedish Anti-Doping Committee from 2002 to 2021, and board member of Anti-Doping Sweden since 2022. She has been working as a Gynecologist in the Swedish Team of DSD since 2008 and Gynecologist-in-Attendance to the Swedish Royal Family since 2009. She holds the positions of the Head of Women's Health Research Unit, Senior Consultant in charge of Gynecological Endicronology, and Chairman of Research & Development in Gynecology and Reproductive Medicine at Karolinska University Hospital.

== Research ==
Hirschberg has contributed to the field of gynecological endocrinology by studying the disorders of reproductive function, gonadal development in women and female athletic performance through translational and experimental research.

=== Disorders of reproductive function ===
Hirschberg has investigated the disorders of reproductive function to understand long-term health in women. She collaborated to develop international polyendocrine metabolic ovarian syndrome (PMOS) guidelines that offered recommendations, emphasizing refined diagnostics, reduced testing, lifestyle focus, and evidence-based medical therapy to enhance care for affected women. She also contributed to evidence that lifestyle interventions improve reproductive and metabolic health in overweight/obese women with PMOS, emphasizing enhanced insulin sensitivity and long-term benefits from personalized lifestyle programs.

Hirschberg demonstrated that reduced postprandial cholecystokinin response is associated with impaired appetite regulation, increased sweet cravings, and higher testosterone levels, potentially contributing to elevated binge eating and overweight in PMOS. She also explored potential treatments for eating disorders and obesity by targeting sex hormones and antiandrogens in women. In a 52-week trial, she showed that a 300 μg daily testosterone patch improved postmenopausal women's sexual function but raised concerns about side effects and breast safety. However, in another investigation, she established that testosterone addition to postmenopausal estrogen/progestogen therapy has an inhibitory effect on hormone therapy-induced breast cell proliferation in postmenopausal women.

In a 2005 study, Hirschberg revealed that pregnant women with past or current eating disorders, particularly anorexia nervosa and bulimia nervosa, face a higher risk of hyperemesis and delivering infants with lower birth weight and smaller head circumference, along with a 22% relapse rate during pregnancy. These results were confirmed in population-based register studies showing increased risk of adverse pregnancy and neonatal outcomes and neurodevelopment disorders in offspring of mothers with eating disorders.

=== Female athletic performance ===
Hirschberg investigated the factors affecting female athletic performance and possible medical risks. She observed that menstrual issues in female endurance athletes, especially amenorrhea, are linked to reduced bone mineral density and flow-mediated dilatation (FMD) and unfavorable lipid profiles, implying cardiovascular risk. In addition, she demonstrated that low-dose oral contraceptives in female athletes improved FMD, body composition, increased bone density, and did not significantly impact physical performance, potentially helping osteoporosis prevention in athletes with amenorrhea.

Later on, her research team was first to identify polyendocrine metabolic ovarian syndrome (PMOS) as a common disorder among female athletes. The studies showed that some female athletes experiencing menstrual irregularities, such as oligomenorrhea or amenorrhea, exhibited elevated androgen levels consistent with PMOS, as well as an anabolic body composition, and a performance advantage. In a collaborative research, it was also reported that the prevalence of severe hyperandrogenism, i.e. having XY karyotype and testosterone in the male range, was 140 times more common among 849 elite female track athletes than in the general population, indicating a selection of women with hyperandrogenism to sports. In a study with David Handelsman and Stephane Bermon, it was reported that puberty-driven testosterone increase in boys is crucial for athletic performance differences between sexes. Moreover, she and her research team published a randomized placebo-controlled trial in British Journal of Sports Medicine demonstrating a causal link between enhanced testosterone and induced increases in lean mass and aerobic performance in exercising women.

== Awards and honors ==
- 1994 – Front line lecture for young scientists, the Nordic Federation of Obstetrics and Gynecology
- 2016 – Grand Prize in Sport Science, Sweden's Central Association for the Promotion of Sports (SCIF)
- 2018 – King's Seraphim Medal

== Selected articles ==
- Davis, S. R., Moreau, M., Kroll, R., Bouchard, C., Panay, N., Gass, M., Braunstein, G., Hirschberg, A. L, ... & Studd, J. (2008). Testosterone for low libido in postmenopausal women not taking estrogen. New England Journal of Medicine, 359(19), 2005–2017.
- Hagmar, M., Berglund, B., Brismar, K., & Hirschberg, A. L. (2009). Hyperandrogenism may explain reproductive dysfunction in olympic athletes. Medicine and Science in Sports and Exercise, 41(6), 1241–1248.
- Hirschberg, A. L. (2012). Sex hormones, appetite and eating behaviour in women. Maturitas, 71(3), 248–256.
- Huh, W. K., Joura, E. A., Giuliano, A. R., Iversen, O. E., de Andrade, R. P., Ault, K. A., ... & Luxembourg, A. (2017). Final efficacy, immunogenicity, and safety analyses of a nine-valent human papillomavirus vaccine in women aged 16–26 years: a randomised, double-blind trial. The Lancet, 390(10108), 2143–2159.
- Handelsman, D. J., Hirschberg, A. L., & Bermon, S. (2018). Circulating testosterone as the hormonal basis of sex differences in athletic performance. Endocrine reviews, 39(5), 803–829.
- Hirschberg, A. L., Knutsson, J. E., Helge, T., Godhe, M., Ekblom, M., Bermon, S., & Ekblom, B. (2019). Effects of moderately increased testosterone concentration on physical performance in young women: a double blind, randomised, placebo controlled study. British journal of sports medicine, bjsports-2018.
- Hirschberg, A. L. (2023). Approach to Investigation of Hyperandrogenism in a Postmenopausal Woman. The Journal of Clinical Endocrinology & Metabolism, 108(5), 1243–1253.
- Teede, H. J., Tay, C. T., Laven, J. J., Dokras, A., Moran, L. J., Piltonen, T. T., ... & Joham, A. E. (2023). Recommendations from the 2023 international evidence-based guideline for the assessment and management of polycystic ovary syndrome. European journal of endocrinology, 189(2), G43-G64.
