= Alice MacLennan =

Australian physician and medical researcher (died 2015)

Professor Alice MacLennan OAM
- Born: Glasgow, Scotland, United Kingdom
- Died: 10 September 2015; Adelaide, South Australia, Australia
- Known for: Work in reproductive health
- Relatives: Alastair MacLennan (husband)

Alice MacLennan, OAM (died 2015) was an Australian physician and researcher.

Born in Glasgow, Scotland, she studied medicine at the University of Glasgow and undertook further training in Chicago before moving to Australia, where she established a clinic focusing on menopause. She served as Chair of the Council of Affiliated Menopause Societies from 2005 to 2008, and from 2007 to 2009 was president of the Australasian Menopause Society. She also taught at the University of Adelaide as the Clinical Senior Lecturer in Gynaecology.

While studying at the University of Glasgow, Alice met and married Alastair MacLennan, who also qualified as a doctor. The MacLennans had two daughters, Suzanna (born 1974) and Lorna (born 1976), both of whom were born while the couple lived at Oxford. Lorna's birth came earlier than expected, and Alastair delivered her at home.

== Awards and recognition ==
In the 2012 Australia Day Honours, MacLennan was awarded the Medal of the Order of Australia (OAM) in recognition of her distinguished service to medicine, particularly in the area of women's reproductive health, and through roles with professional organisations.

Dr Alice MacLennan and her husband Alastair were jointly awarded the Australasian Menopause Society's Lifetime Achievement Award in 1998.
