= Ovarian mucinous tumor =

Type of tumor

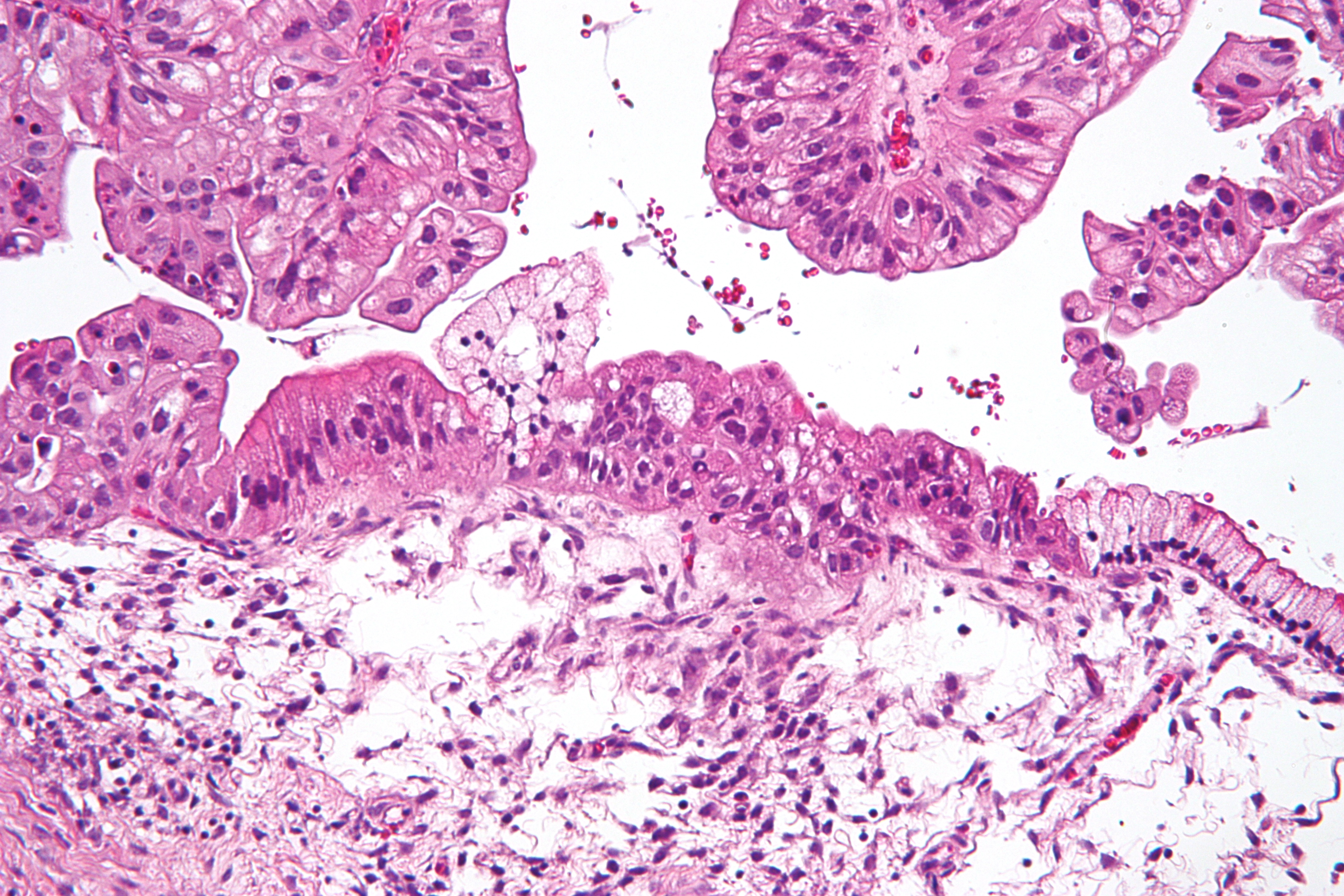
Micrograph of a mucinous ovarian tumor. H&E stain.

Mucinous tumors are a type of ovarian tumor. They are typically large.

They are part of the surface epithelial-stromal tumor group of ovarian neoplasms, and account for approximately 36% of all ovarian tumors. Approximately 75% are benign, 10% are borderline and 15% are malignant. Rarely, the tumor is seen bilaterally; approximately 5% of primary mucinous tumors are bilateral.

Benign mucinous tumors are typically multilocular (have several lobes), and the cysts have a smooth lining of epithelium that resembles endocervical epithelial cells with small numbers of gastrointestinal-type epithelial cells. Borderline and malignant mucinous tumors often have papillae and solid areas. There may also be hemorrhage and necrosis.

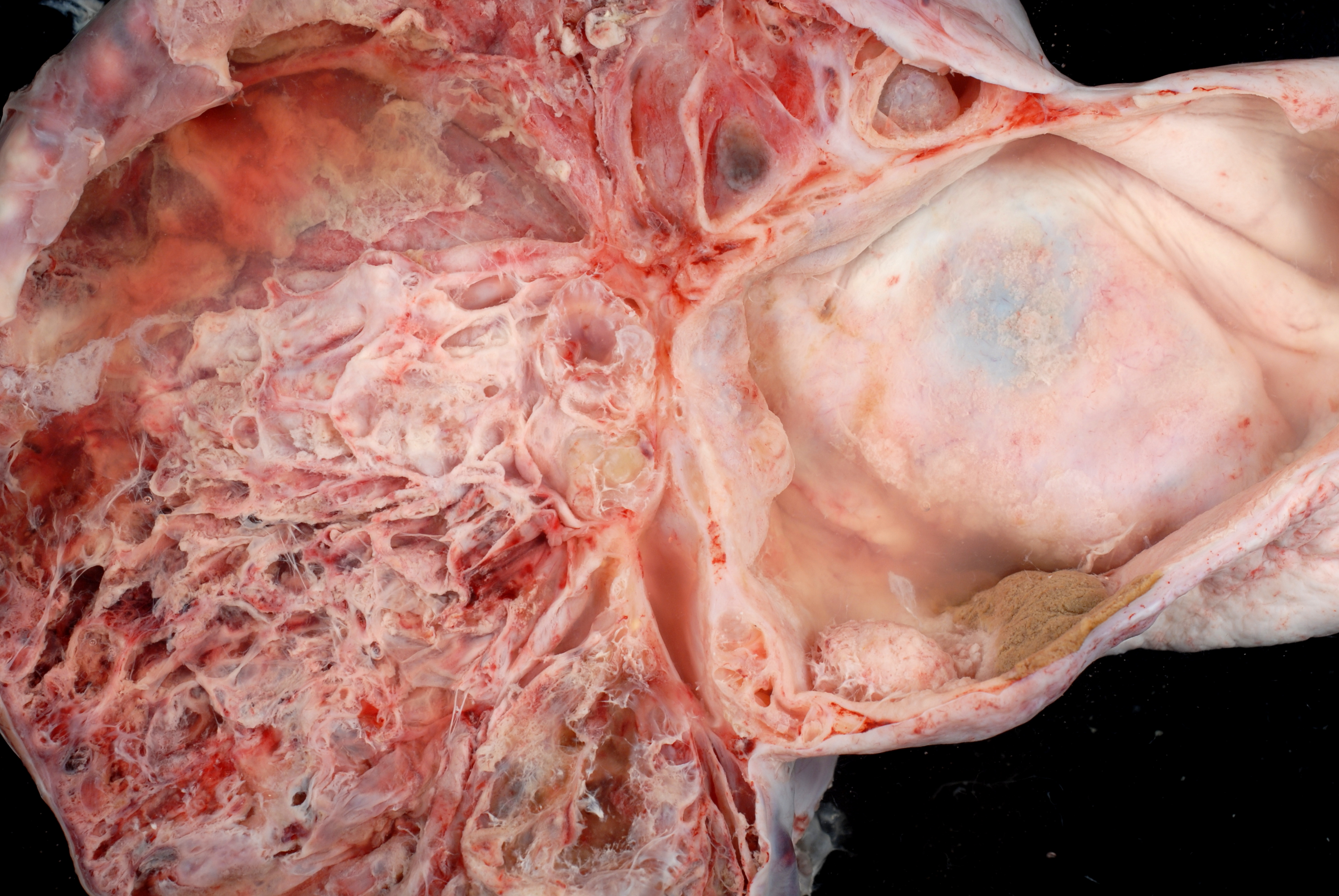
Pathology sample of a mucinous tumor of the ovary.

It is well documented that malignancy may be only focally present in mucinous neoplasms of the ovary, so thorough sampling is imperative.

The major distinguishing features of mucinous tumors are that the tumors are filled with a mucus-like material, which gives them their name; this mucus is produced by mucus-secreting goblet cells very similar to the cells lining normal intestine.

These tumors may become very large, some have been weighed as large as 25 kilograms.

Cystadenocarcinomas (malignant tumors) contain a more solid growth pattern with the hallmarks of malignancy: cellular atypia and stratification, loss of the normal architecture of the tissue, and necrosis. The appearance can look similar to colonic cancer.

Clear stromal invasion is used to differentiate borderline tumors from malignant tumors.

Pseudomyxoma peritonei may present as a result of an ovarian mucinous tumor, however this is a rare cause of this condition, which is a rare condition. A more common cause of pseudomyxoma peritonei is a mucin-producing tumor of the appendix.

Since mucinous tumors arising from the ovary usually only involve one ovary, the presence of involvement in both ovaries with a mucinous tumor suggests that the tumor may have arisen in another location, and further study is warranted.

The risk of mucinous tumors is significantly associated with smoking: relative risk for current smokers 2.22 (2.22 times the risk for non-smokers) and 2.02 for past smokers. Risk is also associated with smoking duration: relative risk per 20 years was 1.44. See article by Tworoger SS in Cancer March 1, 2008 using data from the Nurses Health Study.

== Prognosis ==
10-year survival rates for mucinous tumors is excellent in the absence of invasion. In the case of borderline tumors confined to the ovary and malignant tumors without invasion, the survival rates are 90% or greater. In invasive mucinous cystadenocarcinomas, the survival is approximately 30%. Survival in metastasis is between 12 and 30 months.
