= Vaginal estrogen =

Estrogen administered intervaginally

Vaginal estrogen is a form of estrogen that is delivered by intravaginal administration. Vaginally administered estrogens are thereby exerting their effects mainly in the nearby tissue, with more limited systemic effects compared to orally administered estrogens. It will not protect against osteoporosis. With perhaps the exception of the Femring, it also will not alleviate the hot flashes and hormonal imbalance caused by menopause.

== Indications ==
Vaginally administered estrogen are usually used to treat some menopausal symptoms that are isolated to the vagina, vulva, and urethra.

- The genitourinary syndrome of menopause (GSM), with presentations such as vaginal atrophy, dryness and soreness in the vagina, and dyspareunia (pain during sexual intercourse)
- Itching, redness, or soreness of the vulva
- Urinary urgency (feeling an urge to urinate more often than is needed), or dysuria (experiencing pain while urinating)

== Forms ==
- Vaginal tablets, including Vagifem which contains estradiol
- Vaginal creams, including Premarin which is a compound cream consisting primarily of conjugated estrogens isolated from mare's urine. Another vaginal cream is Ovesterin, which contains estriol.
- Vaginal rings (such as Oestring), which are polymeric drug delivery devices designed to provide controlled release of drugs to the vagina over extended periods of time. Although the Femring might be able to ease hot flashes, this does not appear to be the case for other vaginal estrogen rings or vaginal creams.

== Side effects ==
Most of the vaginally administered estrogens are synthetic and therefore cause the following side effects

Serious side effects:

- chest pain or heavy feeling, pain spreading to the arm or shoulder, nausea, sweating, general ill feeling;
- sudden numbness or weakness, especially on one side of the body;
- sudden severe headache, confusion, problems with vision, speech, or balance;
- pain, swelling, warmth, or redness in one or both legs;
- abnormal vaginal bleeding;
- migraine headache;
- pain, swelling, or tenderness in the stomach;
- confusion, problems with memory or concentration;
- jaundice (yellowing of the skin or eyes);
- swelling in the hands, ankles, or feet; or
- a breast lump.

Less serious side effects may include:

- mild nausea, vomiting, bloating, stomach cramps;
- breast pain, tenderness, or swelling;
- freckles or darkening of facial skin;
- increased hair growth, loss of scalp hair;
- changes in weight or appetite;
- problems with contact lenses;
- vaginal itching or discharge;
- changes in the menstrual periods, decreased sex drive; or
- headache, nervousness, dizziness, tired feeling.

== Contraindications ==
Estrogen administered vaginally should not be given to persons who are:

=== Pregnant women ===
Estrogen should not be used while pregnant as it could cause serious birth defects.

=== Breastfeeding ===
Estrogen passes into the breast milk and will cause a decrease in the production and quality of breast milk.

== Alternatives ==
To effectively alleviate the symptoms of menopause, it is best to take oral estrogen instead of topical estrogen since the results are systemic and it will rejuvenate the entire reproductive system and not just the perineal area.

Phytoestrogens are plant derived compounds found in a wide variety of foods. Several health benefits including a lowered risk of osteoporosis, heart disease, breast cancer, and menopausal symptoms are frequently attributed to phytoestrogens but many are also considered to have the potential to cause adverse health effects. Plants such as Kacip Fatimah have been found to contain phytoestrogens that could alleviate some symptoms of menopause.

== See also ==
- Pharmacokinetics of estradiol § Vaginal administration
