= Climacteric (journal) =

- Discipline: Menopause, climacteric
- Language: English
- Edited by: Timothy Hillard

Publication details
- History: 1998-present
- Publisher: Taylor and Francis Group
- Frequency: Bimonthly
- Impact factor: 3.2 (2024)

Standard abbreviations
- ISO 4: Climacteric

Indexing
- ISSN: 1369-7137 (print); 1473-0804 (web)
- OCLC no.: 628845631

Links
- Journal homepage; Online access; Online archive

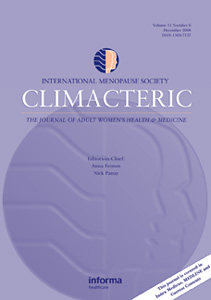
Cover image of the journal "Climacteric" Vol. 11, issue 6, December 2008

Climacteric is a bimonthly peer-reviewed medical journal established in 1998 that covers all aspects of aging in women, especially during the menopause. It is the official journal of the International Menopause Society.
