= International Menopause Society =

Charity organisation

International Menopause Society (IMS)
- Founded: 1978
- Location: 13 Leechwell Street, Totnes, Devon TQ9 5SX, UK
- Region served: Global
- Members: 500+
- Key people: Prof Rossella Nappi, current President, Rebecca Cheshire, current Chief Executive Officer
- Website: www.imsociety.org

The International Menopause Society (IMS) is a UK based charity. The Society was created in 1978 in Jerusalem during the second Menopause Congress. In addition to organizing congresses, symposia, and workshops, the IMS owns its own journal: Climacteric, the Journal of Adult Women's Health and Medicine, published by Taylor & Francis.

== Resources and publications ==
The Society's official journal, Climacteric, the Journal of Adult Women's Health and Medicine, was founded in 1998 and is listed in Index Medicus/MEDLINE. The Editor-in-Chief is Timothy Hillard. It publishes international, original, peer-reviewed research on all aspects of aging in women, especially during the menopause and climacteric. The content of the journal covers the whole range of subject areas relevant to climacteric studies and adult women’s health and medicine, including underlying endocrinological changes, treatment of the symptoms of the menopause and other age-related changes, treatments, effective life-style modifications, non-hormonal midlife changes, and the counselling and education of perimenopausal and postmenopausal patients.

== See also ==
- North American Menopause Society
- European Menopause and Andropause Society
