= Maturitas =

- Discipline: [Gynecology/ Gerontology]
- Language: English
- Edited by: Irene Lambrinoudaki [Gynecology/Endocrinology] and Leon Flicker [Aging/Older People]

Publication details
- History: 1978-present
- Publisher: Elsevier
- Frequency: Monthly
- Impact factor: 4.342 (2020)

Standard abbreviations
- ISO 4: Maturitas

Indexing
- CODEN: MATUDK
- ISSN: 0378-5122 (print); 1873-4111 (web)
- OCLC no.: 16310829

Links
- Journal homepage; Online access; Online archive; Journal page at publisher's website

Maturitas is a monthly peer-reviewed medical journal covering midlife and post-reproductive health. It was established in 1978 and is the official journal of the European Menopause and Andropause Society; it is also affiliated with the Australasian Menopause Society. It is published by Elsevier and the editors-in-chief are Irene Lambrinoudaki and Leon Flicker. According to the Journal Citation Reports, the journal has a 2020 impact factor of 4.342.
