= European Menopause and Andropause Society =

Swiss-based medical association

European Menopause and Andropause Society (EMAS)
- Founded: 1998
- Location: Geneva, Switzerland
- Region served: Europe
- Key people: Prof. Angelica Lindén Hirschberg, President; Prof. Margaret Rees, Executive Director; Prof. Irene Lambrinoudaki, Scientific Director
- Website: emas-online.org

The European Menopause and Andropause Society is an institution that promotes the study, and encourages research of midlife health. Founded in 1998.

== Activities ==
The official journal of EMAS, Maturitas, is published on a monthly basis by Elsevier Science It covers a variety of disciplines, including management of chronic diseases, epidemiology, therapeutic techniques, and alternative medicine. The journal impact factor is 5.110. Irene Lambrinoudaki and Leon Flicker are the Editors-in-Chief. EMAS is now affiliated with Case Reports in Women's Health, also published by Elsevier. The Editor-in-Chief is Margaret Rees.

EMAS participates in a variety of medical congresses related to menopause, gynecology, and obstetrics each year. The society hosts its own European Congress every two years. EMAS also organises educational schools on menopausal health.

EMAS provides online education on its website with the textbook EMAS Care Online 2020 accompanied by PowerPoint presentations.

The aim of the mentorship programme, JuMP, is to encourage career development of junior clinicians and researchers in the field of post-reproductive health by pairing one expert mentor with a mentee, based on mutual research interests. The last round, 2021 – 2023, is completed.

The 12th European Congress on Menopause and Andropause was held in Berlin, in May 2019.

The 13th EMAS Congress took place virtually 8-10 September 2021 starting on 7 September with the launch of the first-ever World Menopause & Work Day.

== See also ==
- North American Menopause Society
- International Menopause Society
