= Ethinylandrostenediol =

Chemical compound

Clinical data
- Other names: SKF-2856; 17α-Ethynyl-5-androstenediol; 17α-Ethynylandrost-5-ene-3β,17-diol; 17α-Pregn-5-en-20-yne-3β,17-diol; NSC-17098
- Drug class: Estrogen; Progestogen; Progestin

Identifiers
- IUPAC name: (3S,8R,9S,10R,13S,14S,17R)-17-ethynyl-10,13-dimethyl-1,2,3,4,7,8,9,11,12,14,15,16-dodecahydrocyclopenta[a]phenanthrene-3,17-diol
- CAS Number: 3604-60-2
- ChemSpider: 96678
- ChEMBL: ChEMBL410519
- CompTox Dashboard (EPA): DTXSID00957444

Chemical and physical data
- Formula: C_{21}H_{30}O_{2}
- Molar mass: 314.469 g·mol^{−1}
- 3D model (JSmol): Interactive image
- SMILES: C[C@]12CC[C@@H](CC1=CC[C@@H]3[C@@H]2CC[C@]4([C@H]3CC[C@]4(C#C)O)C)O
- InChI: InChI=1S/C21H30O2/c1-4-21(23)12-9-18-16-6-5-14-13-15(22)7-10-19(14,2)17(16)8-11-20(18,21)3/h1,5,15-18,22-23H,6-13H2,2-3H3/t15-,16+,17-,18-,19-,20-,21-/m0/s1; Key:VGJUOWGYQZYCII-TVWVXWENSA-N

Ethinylandrostenediol (developmental code name SKF-2856), also known as 17α-ethynyl-5-androstenediol, is a synthetic estrogen, progestogen, and androgen which was never marketed. It is the C17α ethynyl derivative of the androgen precursor and prohormone 5-androstenediol.

Ethinylandrostenediol was first synthesized in the late 1930s and along with its close analogue ethisterone (17α-ethynyltestosterone) was one of the first progestins (synthetic progestogens) to be developed. Ethinylandrostenediol is orally active similarly to ethisterone and shows about half its progestogenic potency. Ethinylandrostenediol was an intermediate in the initial synthesis of ethisterone.

Ethinylandrostenediol shows tissue selectivity in its estrogenic effects in animals and doesn't seem to have estrogenic effects in the uterus. The androgenic activity of ethinylandrostenediol is weak.

An ester of ethinylandrostenediol, ethandrostate (17α-ethynyl-5-androstenediol 3β-cyclohexylpropionate), has been studied clinically in men and women with prostate cancer and breast cancer, respectively.

Notable structural analogues of ethinylandrostenediol include 5-androstenediol, 17α-ethynyl-3β-androstanediol, 17α-ethynyl-3α-androstanediol, ethisterone (17α-ethynyltestosterone), and methandriol (17α-methyl-5-androstenediol), as well as ethinylestradiol (17α-ethynylestradiol or 17α-ethynylestra-1,3,5(10)-triene-3,17β-diol).

Affinities of estrogen receptor ligands for the ERα and ERβ
| Ligand | Other names | Relative binding affinities (RBA, %)^{a} | | Absolute binding affinities (K_{i}, nM)^{a} | | Action |
| Ligand | Other names | ERα | ERβ | ERα | ERβ | Action |
|---|---|---|---|---|---|---|
| Estradiol | E2; 17β-Estradiol | 100 | 100 | 0.115 (0.04–0.24) | 0.15 (0.10–2.08) | Estrogen |
| Estrone | E1; 17-Ketoestradiol | 16.39 (0.7–60) | 6.5 (1.36–52) | 0.445 (0.3–1.01) | 1.75 (0.35–9.24) | Estrogen |
| Estriol | E3; 16α-OH-17β-E2 | 12.65 (4.03–56) | 26 (14.0–44.6) | 0.45 (0.35–1.4) | 0.7 (0.63–0.7) | Estrogen |
| Estetrol | E4; 15α,16α-Di-OH-17β-E2 | 4.0 | 3.0 | 4.9 | 19 | Estrogen |
| Alfatradiol | 17α-Estradiol | 20.5 (7–80.1) | 8.195 (2–42) | 0.2–0.52 | 0.43–1.2 | Metabolite |
| 16-Epiestriol | 16β-Hydroxy-17β-estradiol | 7.795 (4.94–63) | 50 | ? | ? | Metabolite |
| 17-Epiestriol | 16α-Hydroxy-17α-estradiol | 55.45 (29–103) | 79–80 | ? | ? | Metabolite |
| 16,17-Epiestriol | 16β-Hydroxy-17α-estradiol | 1.0 | 13 | ? | ? | Metabolite |
| 2-Hydroxyestradiol | 2-OH-E2 | 22 (7–81) | 11–35 | 2.5 | 1.3 | Metabolite |
| 2-Methoxyestradiol | 2-MeO-E2 | 0.0027–2.0 | 1.0 | ? | ? | Metabolite |
| 4-Hydroxyestradiol | 4-OH-E2 | 13 (8–70) | 7–56 | 1.0 | 1.9 | Metabolite |
| 4-Methoxyestradiol | 4-MeO-E2 | 2.0 | 1.0 | ? | ? | Metabolite |
| 2-Hydroxyestrone | 2-OH-E1 | 2.0–4.0 | 0.2–0.4 | ? | ? | Metabolite |
| 2-Methoxyestrone | 2-MeO-E1 | <0.001–<1 | <1 | ? | ? | Metabolite |
| 4-Hydroxyestrone | 4-OH-E1 | 1.0–2.0 | 1.0 | ? | ? | Metabolite |
| 4-Methoxyestrone | 4-MeO-E1 | <1 | <1 | ? | ? | Metabolite |
| 16α-Hydroxyestrone | 16α-OH-E1; 17-Ketoestriol | 2.0–6.5 | 35 | ? | ? | Metabolite |
| 2-Hydroxyestriol | 2-OH-E3 | 2.0 | 1.0 | ? | ? | Metabolite |
| 4-Methoxyestriol | 4-MeO-E3 | 1.0 | 1.0 | ? | ? | Metabolite |
| Estradiol sulfate | E2S; Estradiol 3-sulfate | <1 | <1 | ? | ? | Metabolite |
| Estradiol disulfate | Estradiol 3,17β-disulfate | 0.0004 | ? | ? | ? | Metabolite |
| Estradiol 3-glucuronide | E2-3G | 0.0079 | ? | ? | ? | Metabolite |
| Estradiol 17β-glucuronide | E2-17G | 0.0015 | ? | ? | ? | Metabolite |
| Estradiol 3-gluc. 17β-sulfate | E2-3G-17S | 0.0001 | ? | ? | ? | Metabolite |
| Estrone sulfate | E1S; Estrone 3-sulfate | <1 | <1 | >10 | >10 | Metabolite |
| Estradiol benzoate | EB; Estradiol 3-benzoate | 10 | ? | ? | ? | Estrogen |
| Estradiol 17β-benzoate | E2-17B | 11.3 | 32.6 | ? | ? | Estrogen |
| Estrone methyl ether | Estrone 3-methyl ether | 0.145 | ? | ? | ? | Estrogen |
| ent-Estradiol | 1-Estradiol | 1.31–12.34 | 9.44–80.07 | ? | ? | Estrogen |
| Equilin | 7-Dehydroestrone | 13 (4.0–28.9) | 13.0–49 | 0.79 | 0.36 | Estrogen |
| Equilenin | 6,8-Didehydroestrone | 2.0–15 | 7.0–20 | 0.64 | 0.62 | Estrogen |
| 17β-Dihydroequilin | 7-Dehydro-17β-estradiol | 7.9–113 | 7.9–108 | 0.09 | 0.17 | Estrogen |
| 17α-Dihydroequilin | 7-Dehydro-17α-estradiol | 18.6 (18–41) | 14–32 | 0.24 | 0.57 | Estrogen |
| 17β-Dihydroequilenin | 6,8-Didehydro-17β-estradiol | 35–68 | 90–100 | 0.15 | 0.20 | Estrogen |
| 17α-Dihydroequilenin | 6,8-Didehydro-17α-estradiol | 20 | 49 | 0.50 | 0.37 | Estrogen |
| Δ^{8}-Estradiol | 8,9-Dehydro-17β-estradiol | 68 | 72 | 0.15 | 0.25 | Estrogen |
| Δ^{8}-Estrone | 8,9-Dehydroestrone | 19 | 32 | 0.52 | 0.57 | Estrogen |
| Ethinylestradiol | EE; 17α-Ethynyl-17β-E2 | 120.9 (68.8–480) | 44.4 (2.0–144) | 0.02–0.05 | 0.29–0.81 | Estrogen |
| Mestranol | EE 3-methyl ether | ? | 2.5 | ? | ? | Estrogen |
| Moxestrol | RU-2858; 11β-Methoxy-EE | 35–43 | 5–20 | 0.5 | 2.6 | Estrogen |
| Methylestradiol | 17α-Methyl-17β-estradiol | 70 | 44 | ? | ? | Estrogen |
| Diethylstilbestrol | DES; Stilbestrol | 129.5 (89.1–468) | 219.63 (61.2–295) | 0.04 | 0.05 | Estrogen |
| Hexestrol | Dihydrodiethylstilbestrol | 153.6 (31–302) | 60–234 | 0.06 | 0.06 | Estrogen |
| Dienestrol | Dehydrostilbestrol | 37 (20.4–223) | 56–404 | 0.05 | 0.03 | Estrogen |
| Benzestrol (B2) | – | 114 | ? | ? | ? | Estrogen |
| Chlorotrianisene | TACE | 1.74 | ? | 15.30 | ? | Estrogen |
| Triphenylethylene | TPE | 0.074 | ? | ? | ? | Estrogen |
| Triphenylbromoethylene | TPBE | 2.69 | ? | ? | ? | Estrogen |
| Tamoxifen | ICI-46,474 | 3 (0.1–47) | 3.33 (0.28–6) | 3.4–9.69 | 2.5 | SERM |
| Afimoxifene | 4-Hydroxytamoxifen; 4-OHT | 100.1 (1.7–257) | 10 (0.98–339) | 2.3 (0.1–3.61) | 0.04–4.8 | SERM |
| Toremifene | 4-Chlorotamoxifen; 4-CT | ? | ? | 7.14–20.3 | 15.4 | SERM |
| Clomifene | MRL-41 | 25 (19.2–37.2) | 12 | 0.9 | 1.2 | SERM |
| Cyclofenil | F-6066; Sexovid | 151–152 | 243 | ? | ? | SERM |
| Nafoxidine | U-11,000A | 30.9–44 | 16 | 0.3 | 0.8 | SERM |
| Raloxifene | – | 41.2 (7.8–69) | 5.34 (0.54–16) | 0.188–0.52 | 20.2 | SERM |
| Arzoxifene | LY-353,381 | ? | ? | 0.179 | ? | SERM |
| Lasofoxifene | CP-336,156 | 10.2–166 | 19.0 | 0.229 | ? | SERM |
| Ormeloxifene | Centchroman | ? | ? | 0.313 | ? | SERM |
| Levormeloxifene | 6720-CDRI; NNC-460,020 | 1.55 | 1.88 | ? | ? | SERM |
| Ospemifene | Deaminohydroxytoremifene | 0.82–2.63 | 0.59–1.22 | ? | ? | SERM |
| Bazedoxifene | – | ? | ? | 0.053 | ? | SERM |
| Etacstil | GW-5638 | 4.30 | 11.5 | ? | ? | SERM |
| ICI-164,384 | – | 63.5 (3.70–97.7) | 166 | 0.2 | 0.08 | Antiestrogen |
| Fulvestrant | ICI-182,780 | 43.5 (9.4–325) | 21.65 (2.05–40.5) | 0.42 | 1.3 | Antiestrogen |
| Propylpyrazoletriol | PPT | 49 (10.0–89.1) | 0.12 | 0.40 | 92.8 | ERα agonist |
| 16α-LE2 | 16α-Lactone-17β-estradiol | 14.6–57 | 0.089 | 0.27 | 131 | ERα agonist |
| 16α-Iodo-E2 | 16α-Iodo-17β-estradiol | 30.2 | 2.30 | ? | ? | ERα agonist |
| Methylpiperidinopyrazole | MPP | 11 | 0.05 | ? | ? | ERα antagonist |
| Diarylpropionitrile | DPN | 0.12–0.25 | 6.6–18 | 32.4 | 1.7 | ERβ agonist |
| 8β-VE2 | 8β-Vinyl-17β-estradiol | 0.35 | 22.0–83 | 12.9 | 0.50 | ERβ agonist |
| Prinaberel | ERB-041; WAY-202,041 | 0.27 | 67–72 | ? | ? | ERβ agonist |
| ERB-196 | WAY-202,196 | ? | 180 | ? | ? | ERβ agonist |
| Erteberel | SERBA-1; LY-500,307 | ? | ? | 2.68 | 0.19 | ERβ agonist |
| SERBA-2 | – | ? | ? | 14.5 | 1.54 | ERβ agonist |
| Coumestrol | – | 9.225 (0.0117–94) | 64.125 (0.41–185) | 0.14–80.0 | 0.07–27.0 | Xenoestrogen |
| Genistein | – | 0.445 (0.0012–16) | 33.42 (0.86–87) | 2.6–126 | 0.3–12.8 | Xenoestrogen |
| Equol | – | 0.2–0.287 | 0.85 (0.10–2.85) | ? | ? | Xenoestrogen |
| Daidzein | – | 0.07 (0.0018–9.3) | 0.7865 (0.04–17.1) | 2.0 | 85.3 | Xenoestrogen |
| Biochanin A | – | 0.04 (0.022–0.15) | 0.6225 (0.010–1.2) | 174 | 8.9 | Xenoestrogen |
| Kaempferol | – | 0.07 (0.029–0.10) | 2.2 (0.002–3.00) | ? | ? | Xenoestrogen |
| Naringenin | – | 0.0054 (<0.001–0.01) | 0.15 (0.11–0.33) | ? | ? | Xenoestrogen |
| 8-Prenylnaringenin | 8-PN | 4.4 | ? | ? | ? | Xenoestrogen |
| Quercetin | – | <0.001–0.01 | 0.002–0.040 | ? | ? | Xenoestrogen |
| Ipriflavone | – | <0.01 | <0.01 | ? | ? | Xenoestrogen |
| Miroestrol | – | 0.39 | ? | ? | ? | Xenoestrogen |
| Deoxymiroestrol | – | 2.0 | ? | ? | ? | Xenoestrogen |
| β-Sitosterol | – | <0.001–0.0875 | <0.001–0.016 | ? | ? | Xenoestrogen |
| Resveratrol | – | <0.001–0.0032 | ? | ? | ? | Xenoestrogen |
| α-Zearalenol | – | 48 (13–52.5) | ? | ? | ? | Xenoestrogen |
| β-Zearalenol | – | 0.6 (0.032–13) | ? | ? | ? | Xenoestrogen |
| Zeranol | α-Zearalanol | 48–111 | ? | ? | ? | Xenoestrogen |
| Taleranol | β-Zearalanol | 16 (13–17.8) | 14 | 0.8 | 0.9 | Xenoestrogen |
| Zearalenone | ZEN | 7.68 (2.04–28) | 9.45 (2.43–31.5) | ? | ? | Xenoestrogen |
| Zearalanone | ZAN | 0.51 | ? | ? | ? | Xenoestrogen |
| Bisphenol A | BPA | 0.0315 (0.008–1.0) | 0.135 (0.002–4.23) | 195 | 35 | Xenoestrogen |
| Endosulfan | EDS | <0.001–<0.01 | <0.01 | ? | ? | Xenoestrogen |
| Kepone | Chlordecone | 0.0069–0.2 | ? | ? | ? | Xenoestrogen |
| o,p'-DDT | – | 0.0073–0.4 | ? | ? | ? | Xenoestrogen |
| p,p'-DDT | – | 0.03 | ? | ? | ? | Xenoestrogen |
| Methoxychlor | p,p'-Dimethoxy-DDT | 0.01 (<0.001–0.02) | 0.01–0.13 | ? | ? | Xenoestrogen |
| HPTE | Hydroxychlor; p,p'-OH-DDT | 1.2–1.7 | ? | ? | ? | Xenoestrogen |
| Testosterone | T; 4-Androstenolone | <0.0001–<0.01 | <0.002–0.040 | >5000 | >5000 | Androgen |
| Dihydrotestosterone | DHT; 5α-Androstanolone | 0.01 (<0.001–0.05) | 0.0059–0.17 | 221–>5000 | 73–1688 | Androgen |
| Nandrolone | 19-Nortestosterone; 19-NT | 0.01 | 0.23 | 765 | 53 | Androgen |
| Dehydroepiandrosterone | DHEA; Prasterone | 0.038 (<0.001–0.04) | 0.019–0.07 | 245–1053 | 163–515 | Androgen |
| 5-Androstenediol | A5; Androstenediol | 6 | 17 | 3.6 | 0.9 | Androgen |
| 4-Androstenediol | – | 0.5 | 0.6 | 23 | 19 | Androgen |
| 4-Androstenedione | A4; Androstenedione | <0.01 | <0.01 | >10000 | >10000 | Androgen |
| 3α-Androstanediol | 3α-Adiol | 0.07 | 0.3 | 260 | 48 | Androgen |
| 3β-Androstanediol | 3β-Adiol | 3 | 7 | 6 | 2 | Androgen |
| Androstanedione | 5α-Androstanedione | <0.01 | <0.01 | >10000 | >10000 | Androgen |
| Etiocholanedione | 5β-Androstanedione | <0.01 | <0.01 | >10000 | >10000 | Androgen |
| Methyltestosterone | 17α-Methyltestosterone | <0.0001 | ? | ? | ? | Androgen |
| Ethinyl-3α-androstanediol | 17α-Ethynyl-3α-adiol | 4.0 | <0.07 | ? | ? | Estrogen |
| Ethinyl-3β-androstanediol | 17α-Ethynyl-3β-adiol | 50 | 5.6 | ? | ? | Estrogen |
| Progesterone | P4; 4-Pregnenedione | <0.001–0.6 | <0.001–0.010 | ? | ? | Progestogen |
| Norethisterone | NET; 17α-Ethynyl-19-NT | 0.085 (0.0015–<0.1) | 0.1 (0.01–0.3) | 152 | 1084 | Progestogen |
| Norethynodrel | 5(10)-Norethisterone | 0.5 (0.3–0.7) | <0.1–0.22 | 14 | 53 | Progestogen |
| Tibolone | 7α-Methylnorethynodrel | 0.5 (0.45–2.0) | 0.2–0.076 | ? | ? | Progestogen |
| Δ^{4}-Tibolone | 7α-Methylnorethisterone | 0.069–<0.1 | 0.027–<0.1 | ? | ? | Progestogen |
| 3α-Hydroxytibolone | – | 2.5 (1.06–5.0) | 0.6–0.8 | ? | ? | Progestogen |
| 3β-Hydroxytibolone | – | 1.6 (0.75–1.9) | 0.070–0.1 | ? | ? | Progestogen |
Footnotes: ^{a} = (1) Binding affinity values are of the format "median (range)" (# (#–#)), "range" (#–#), or "value" (#) depending on the values available. The full sets of values within the ranges can be found in the Wiki code. (2) Binding affinities were determined via displacement studies in a variety of in-vitro systems with labeled estradiol and human ERα and ERβ proteins (except the ERβ values from Kuiper et al. (1997), which are rat ERβ). Sources: See template page.
