= Estriol =

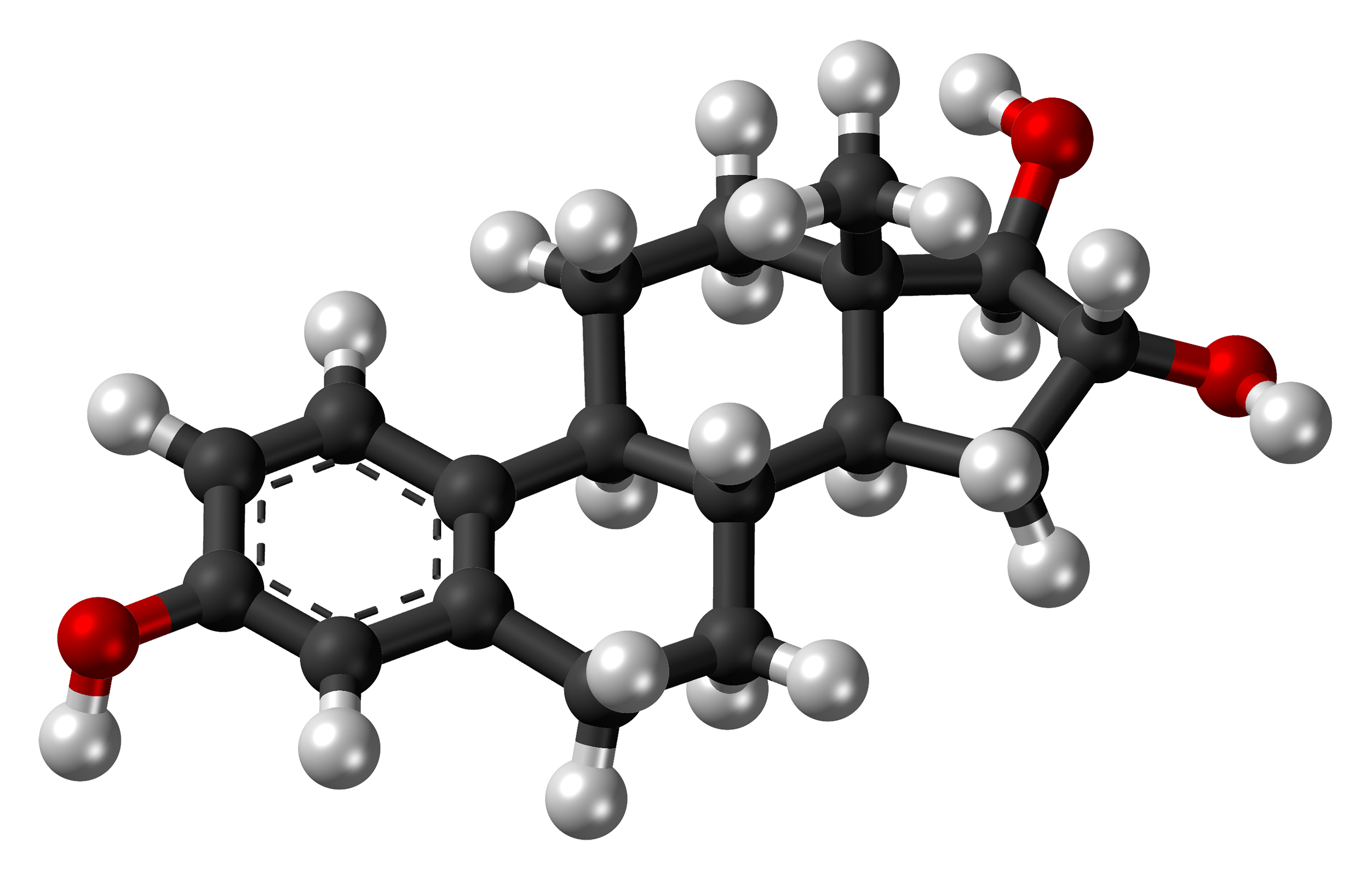

Names
- IUPAC name Estra-1,3,5(10)-triene-3,16α,17β-triol
- Systematic IUPAC name (1R,2R,3aS,3bR,9bS,11aS)-11a-Methyl-2,3,3a,3b,4,5,9b,10,11,11a-decahydro-1H-cyclopenta[a]phenanthrene-1,2,7-triol
- Other names Oestriol; E3; Estratriol; Theelol; Trihydroxyestrin; Trihydroxyoestrin; 16α-Hydroxyestradiol

Identifiers
CAS Number	50-27-1; 1306-04-3
3D model (JSmol)	Interactive image
ChEBI	CHEBI:27974
ChEMBL	ChEMBL193482
ChemSpider	5553
ECHA InfoCard	100.000.021
KEGG	C05141
PubChem CID	5756
UNII	FB33469R8E
CompTox Dashboard (EPA)	DTXSID9022366
- InChI: InChI=1S/C18H24O3/c1-18-7-6-13-12-5-3-11(19)8-10(12)2-4-14(13)15(18)9-16(20)17(18)21/h3,5,8,13-17,19-21H,2,4,6-7,9H2,1H3/t13-,14-,15+,16-,17+,18+/m1/s1 Key: PROQIPRRNZUXQM-ZXXIGWHRSA-N
- SMILES: Oc1ccc2[C@H]3CC[C@]4(C)[C@]5([C@@]6C[C@H]4[C@@H]3CCc2c1).O6.O5

Properties
Chemical formula	C_{18}H_{24}O_{3}
Molar mass	288.387 g/mol
- Except where otherwise noted, data are given for materials in their standard state (at 25 °C [77 °F], 100 kPa). Infobox references

Estriol (E3), also spelled oestriol, is a steroid, a weak estrogen, and a minor female sex hormone. It is one of three major endogenous estrogens, the others being estradiol and estrone. Levels of estriol in women who are not pregnant are almost undetectable. However, during pregnancy, estriol is synthesized in very high quantities by the placenta and is the most produced estrogen in the body by far, although circulating levels of estriol are similar to those of other estrogens due to a relatively high rate of metabolism and excretion. Relative to estradiol, both estriol and estrone have far weaker activity as estrogens.

In addition to its role as a natural hormone, estriol is used as a medication, for instance in menopausal hormone therapy; for information on estriol as a medication, see the estriol (medication) article.

== Biological activity ==
Estriol is an estrogen, specifically an agonist of the estrogen receptors ERα and ERβ. It is a far less potent estrogen than is estradiol, and as such is a relatively weak estrogen. According to one in vitro study, the relative binding affinity (RBA) of estriol for the human ERα and ERβ was 11.3% and 17.6% of that of estradiol, respectively, and the relative transactivational capacity of estriol at the ERα and ERβ was 10.6% and 16.6% of that of estradiol, respectively. According to another in vitro study however, the RBA of estriol for the ERα and ERβ were 14% and 21% of those of estradiol, respectively, suggesting that unlike estradiol and estrone, estriol may have preferential affinity for ERβ.

Although estriol is an efficacious agonist of the ERs, it is reported to have mixed agonist–antagonist (partial agonist) activity at the ER; on its own, it is weakly estrogenic, but in the presence of estradiol, it is antiestrogenic. Given by subcutaneous injection in mice, estradiol is about 10-fold more potent than estrone and about 100-fold more potent than estriol. It is notable that unlike estriol, estrone can be metabolized into estradiol, and most of its potency in vivo is in fact actually due to conversion into estradiol.

In addition to acting as an agonist of the nuclear ERs, estriol at high concentrations (~1,000–10,000 nM) also acts as an antagonist of the GPER, a membrane estrogen receptor where, conversely, estradiol acts as an agonist. Estradiol increases breast cancer cell growth via activation of the GPER (in addition to the ER), and estriol has been found to inhibit estradiol-induced proliferation of triple-negative breast cancer cells through blockade of the GPER.

Selected biological properties of endogenous estrogens in rats
Estrogen	ER RBA (%)	Uterine weight (%)	Uterotrophy	LH levels (%)	SHBG RBA (%)
Control	–	100	–	100	–
Estradiol (E2)	100	506 ± 20	+++	12–19	100
Estrone (E1)	11 ± 8	490 ± 22	+++	?	20
Estriol (E3)	10 ± 4	468 ± 30	+++	8–18	3
Estetrol (E4)	0.5 ± 0.2	?	Inactive	?	1
17α-Estradiol	4.2 ± 0.8	?	?	?	?
2-Hydroxyestradiol	24 ± 7	285 ± 8	+^{b}	31–61	28
2-Methoxyestradiol	0.05 ± 0.04	101	Inactive	?	130
4-Hydroxyestradiol	45 ± 12	?	?	?	?
4-Methoxyestradiol	1.3 ± 0.2	260	++	?	9
4-Fluoroestradiol^{a}	180 ± 43	?	+++	?	?
2-Hydroxyestrone	1.9 ± 0.8	130 ± 9	Inactive	110–142	8
2-Methoxyestrone	0.01 ± 0.00	103 ± 7	Inactive	95–100	120
4-Hydroxyestrone	11 ± 4	351	++	21–50	35
4-Methoxyestrone	0.13 ± 0.04	338	++	65–92	12
16α-Hydroxyestrone	2.8 ± 1.0	552 ± 42	+++	7–24	<0.5
2-Hydroxyestriol	0.9 ± 0.3	302	+^{b}	?	?
2-Methoxyestriol	0.01 ± 0.00	?	Inactive	?	4
Notes: Values are mean ± SD or range. ER RBA = Relative binding affinity to estrogen receptors of rat uterine cytosol. Uterine weight = Percentage change in uterine wet weight of ovariectomized rats after 72 hours with continuous administration of 1 μg/hour via subcutaneously implanted osmotic pumps. LH levels = Luteinizing hormone levels relative to baseline of ovariectomized rats after 24 to 72 hours of continuous administration via subcutaneous implant. Footnotes: ^{a} = Synthetic (i.e., not endogenous). ^{b} = Atypical uterotrophic effect which plateaus within 48 hours (estradiol's uterotrophy continues linearly up to 72 hours). Sources:

== Biochemistry ==
Human steroidogenesis, showing estriol at bottom right. In essence, it follows the pathway from dehydroepiandrosterone or DHEA (at left), but with a modified DHEA with an additional OH-group.

=== Biosynthesis ===
==== In non-pregnant women ====
In women who are not pregnant estriol is produced in only very small quantities, and circulating levels are barely detectable. Unlike estradiol and estrone, estriol is not synthesized in or secreted from the ovaries, and is instead derived mainly if not exclusively from 16α-hydroxylation of estradiol and estrone by cytochrome P450 enzymes (e.g., CYP3A4) mainly in the liver. Estriol is cleared from the circulation rapidly in non-pregnant women, and so circulating levels are very low, but concentrations of estriol in the urine are relatively high.

Although circulating levels of estriol are very low outside of pregnancy, parous women have been found to have levels of estriol that are to some degree higher than those of nulliparous women.

==== In pregnant women ====
Estriol is produced in quantities that are notable only during pregnancy. Levels of estriol increase 1,000-fold during pregnancy, whereas levels of estradiol and estrone increase 100-fold, and estriol accounts for 90% of the estrogens in the urine of pregnant women. At term, the daily production of estriol by the placenta is 35 to 45 mg, and levels in the maternal circulation are 8 to 13 ng/dL.

The placenta produces pregnenolone and progesterone from circulating cholesterol. Pregnenolone is taken up by the fetal adrenal glands and converted into dehydroepiandrosterone (DHEA), which is then sulfated by steroid sulfotransferase into dehydroepiandrosterone sulfate (DHEA-S). DHEA-S is hydroxylated by high CYP3A7 expression and activity into 16α-hydroxy-DHEA-S (16α-OH-DHEA-S) in the fetal liver and to a limited extent in the fetal adrenal glands. 16α-OH-DHEA-S is then taken up by the placenta. Due to high expression of steroid sulfatase in the placenta, 16α-OH-DHEA-S is rapidly cleaved into 16α-OH-DHEA. Then, 16α-OH-DHEA is converted by 3β-hydroxysteroid dehydrogenase type I (3β-HSD1) into 16α-hydroxyandrostenedione (16α-OH-A4) and 16α-OH-A4 is converted by aromatase into 16α-hydroxyestrone (16α-OH-E1), which is subsequently converted into estriol by 17β-hydroxysteroid dehydrogenase and then secreted predominantly into the maternal circulation. Approximately 90% of precursors in estriol formation originate from the fetus.

During pregnancy, 90 to 95% of estriol in the maternal circulation is conjugated in the form of estriol glucuronide and estriol sulfate, and levels of unconjugated estriol are slightly less than those of unconjugated estradiol and similar to those of unconjugated estrone. As such, target tissues are likely to be exposed to similar amounts of free estriol, estradiol, and estrone during pregnancy.

Estrone and estradiol are also produced in the placenta during pregnancy. However, in the case of estrone and estradiol, DHEA-S is taken up by the placenta and cleaved by steroid sulfatase into dehydroepiandrosterone (DHEA), DHEA is converted by 3β-hydroxysteroid dehydrogenase type I into androstenedione, and androstenedione is aromatized into estrone. Then, placental 17β-hydroxysteroid dehydrogenase interconverts estrone and estradiol and the two hormones are secreted into the maternal circulation. DHEA-S that is taken up by the placenta is mainly produced by the fetal adrenal glands.

=== Distribution ===
Estriol is poorly bound to sex hormone-binding globulin (SHBG), with much lower binding affinity for this protein, relative to estradiol, and hence a greater fraction available for biological activity.

=== Metabolism ===
Estriol is metabolized via glucuronidation and sulfation.

=== Excretion ===
The main urinary metabolites of exogenous estriol administered via intravenous injection in baboons have been found to be estriol 16α-glucuronide (65.8%), estriol 3-glucuronide (14.2%), estriol 3-sulfate (13.4%), and estriol 3-sulfate 16α-glucuronide (5.1%). The metabolism and excretion of estriol in these animals closely resembled that which has been observed in humans. In non-pregnant women, estriol urinary excretion ranges between 0.02–0.1 mg every 24 hours. In comparison, in near-term pregnant women, estriol urinary excretion ranges from 50–150 mg every 24 hours.

== Medical use ==
Estriol is used as a medication, primarily in hormone therapy for menopausal symptoms.

== Chemistry ==
Structures of major endogenous estrogens
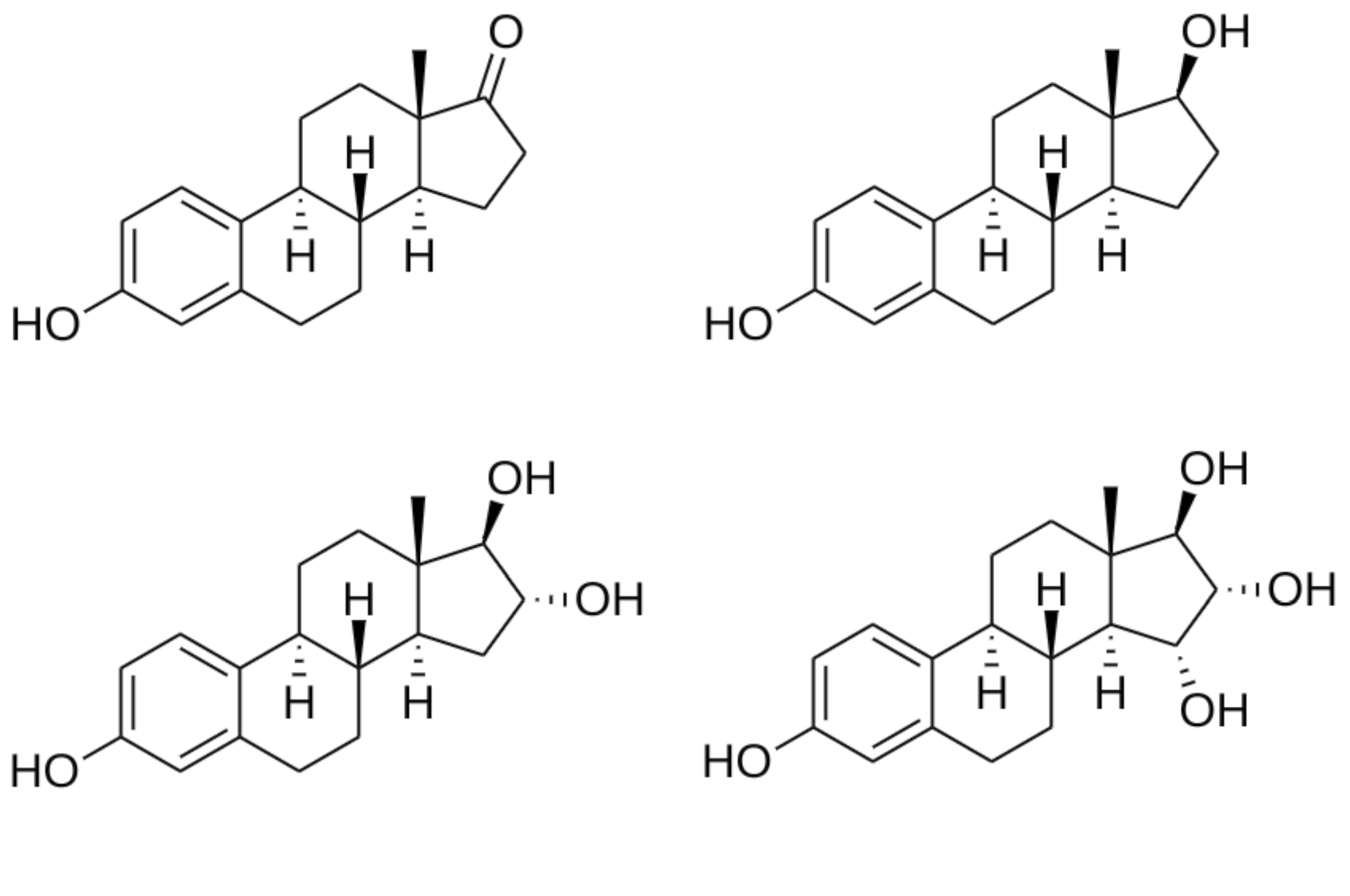
Note the hydroxyl (–OH) groups: estrone (E1) has one, estradiol (E2) has two, estriol (E3) has three, and estetrol (E4) has four.

Estriol, also known as 16α-hydroxyestradiol or as estra-1,3,5(10)-triene-3,16α,17β-triol, is a naturally occurring estrane steroid with double bonds between the C1 and C2, C3 and C4, and C5 and C10 positions and hydroxyl groups at the C3, C16α, and C17β positions. The name estriol and the abbreviation E3 were derived from the chemical terms estrin (estra-1,3,5(10)-triene) and triol (three hydroxyl groups).

== History ==
Estriol was discovered in 1930. It was isolated and purified from the urine of pregnant women by Marrian and colleagues.

== Use in screening ==
Estriol can be measured in maternal blood or urine and can be used as a marker of fetal health and well-being. If levels of unconjugated estriol (uE3 or free estriol) are abnormally low in a pregnant woman, this may indicate chromosomal or congenital anomalies like Down syndrome or Edward's syndrome. It is included as part of the triple test and quadruple test for antenatal screening for fetal anomalies.

Because many pathological conditions in a pregnant woman can cause deviations in estriol levels, these screenings are often seen as less definitive of fetal-placental health than a nonstress test. Conditions which can create false positives and false negatives in estriol testing for fetal distress include preeclampsia, anemia, and impaired kidney function.
