= 4-Methoxyestriol =

Names
- IUPAC name 4-Methoxyestra-1,3,5(10)-triene-3,16α,17β-triol
- Systematic IUPAC name (1R,2R,3aS,3bR,9bS,11aS)-6-Methoxy-11a-methyl-2,3,3a,3b,4,5,9b,10,11,11a-decahydro-1H-cyclopenta[a]phenanthrene-1,2,7-triol
- Other names 4-MeO-E3

Identifiers
CAS Number	101534-28-5
3D model (JSmol)	Interactive image
ChemSpider	8077213
PubChem CID	9901559
- InChI: InChI=1S/C19H26O4/c1-19-8-7-11-10-5-6-15(20)17(23-2)13(10)4-3-12(11)14(19)9-16(21)18(19)22/h5-6,11-12,14,16,18,20-22H,3-4,7-9H2,1-2H3/t11-,12-,14+,16-,18+,19+/m1/s1 Key: MTZUPVFOGAXGJG-JUVWIQMMSA-N
- SMILES: C[C@]12CC[C@H]3[C@H]([C@@H]1C[C@H]([C@@H]2O)O)CCC4=C3C=CC(=C4OC)O

Properties
Chemical formula	C_{19}H_{26}O_{4}
Molar mass	318.413 g·mol^{−1}
- Except where otherwise noted, data are given for materials in their standard state (at 25 °C [77 °F], 100 kPa). Infobox references

4-Methoxyestriol (4-MeO-E3) is an endogenous estrogen metabolite. It is the 4-methyl ether of 4-hydroxyestriol and a metabolite of estriol and 4-hydroxyestriol. 4-Methoxyestriol has very low affinities for the estrogen receptors. Its relative binding affinities (RBAs) for estrogen receptor alpha (ERα) and estrogen receptor beta (ERβ) are both about 1% of those of estradiol. For comparison, estriol had RBAs of 11% and 35%, respectively.

== See also ==
- 2-Methoxyestradiol
- 2-Methoxyestriol
- 2-Methoxyestrone
- 4-Methoxyestradiol
- 4-Methoxyestrone
