= Hydroxyestriol =

Hydroxyestriol may refer to:

- 2-Hydroxyestriol
- 4-Hydroxyestriol
- 15α-Hydroxyestriol (estetrol)
