= C21H30O4 =

The molecular formula C_{21}H_{30}O_{4} (molar mass: 346.46 g/mol, exact mass: 346.2144 u) may refer to:

- Algestone, a pregnane steroid
- Corticosterone, a steroid hormone
- 18-Hydroxy-11-deoxycorticosterone, a steroid hormone
- Deoxycortisols
  - 11-Deoxycortisol, a steroid hormone
  - 17-Deoxycortisol, a steroid
  - 21-Deoxycortisol, a steroid
- MP-2001, a synthetic steroid
- Cannabimovone, a phytocannabinoid
- Cannabitriol, a phytocannabinoid
- 8,11-Dihydroxytetrahydrocannabinol, a metabolite of THC
