= 2-Hydroxyestrone =

Names
- IUPAC name 2,3-Dihydroxyestra-1,3,5(10)-trien-17-one
- Systematic IUPAC name (3aS,3bR,9bS,11aS)-7,8-Dihydroxy-11a-methyl-2,3,3a,3b,4,5,9b,10,11,11a-decahydro-1H-cyclopenta[a]phenanthren-1-one
- Other names 2-OHE1; Estra-1,3,5(10)-trien-2,3-diol-17-one

Identifiers
CAS Number	362-06-1
3D model (JSmol)	Interactive image
ChEBI	CHEBI:1156
ChEMBL	ChEMBL1627343
ChemSpider	389514
ECHA InfoCard	100.164.607
KEGG	C05298
PubChem CID	440623
UNII	UQS3A06ILY
CompTox Dashboard (EPA)	DTXSID80904315
- InChI: InChI=1S/C18H22O3/c1-18-7-6-11-12(14(18)4-5-17(18)21)3-2-10-8-15(19)16(20)9-13(10)11/h8-9,11-12,14,19-20H,2-7H2,1H3/t11-,12+,14-,18-/m0/s1 Key: SWINWPBPEKHUOD-JPVZDGGYSA-N
- SMILES: Oc1c(O)cc2[C@H]3CC[C@]4(C)C(CC[C@H]4[C@@H]3CCc2c1)=O

Properties
Chemical formula	C_{18}H_{22}O_{3}
Molar mass	286.371 g/mol
- Except where otherwise noted, data are given for materials in their standard state (at 25 °C [77 °F], 100 kPa). Infobox references

2-Hydroxyestrone (2-OHE1), also known as estra-1,3,5(10)-trien-2,3-diol-17-one, is an endogenous, naturally occurring catechol estrogen and a major metabolite of estrone and estradiol. It is formed irreversibly from estrone in the liver and to a lesser extent in other tissues via 2-hydroxylation mediated by cytochrome P450 enzymes, mainly the CYP3A and CYP1A subfamilies. 2-OHE1 is the most abundant catechol estrogen in the body.

2-Hydroxyestrone is not significantly uterotrophic in bioassays, whereas other hydroxylated estrogen metabolites including 2-hydroxyestradiol, 16α-hydroxyestrone, estriol (16α-hydroxyestradiol), 4-hydroxyestradiol, and 4-hydroxyestrone all are. In addition, although not antiestrogenic in the uterus, 2-hydroxyestrone shows antiestrogenic effects on luteinizing hormone and prolactin levels. The lack of estrogenic or antiestrogenic activity of 2-hydroxyestrone in the uterus may be attributable to an extremely high metabolic clearance rate. When incubated at very high concentrations or in combination with a catechol O-methyltransferase (COMT) inhibitor to prevent its metabolism, 2-hydroxyestrone shows antiestrogenic effects in estrogen receptor-positive human breast cancer cells.

2-Hydroxyestrone dissociates from the estrogen receptors much more rapidly than does estradiol.

Selected biological properties of endogenous estrogens in rats
Estrogen	ER RBA (%)	Uterine weight (%)	Uterotrophy	LH levels (%)	SHBG RBA (%)
Control	–	100	–	100	–
Estradiol (E2)	100	506 ± 20	+++	12–19	100
Estrone (E1)	11 ± 8	490 ± 22	+++	?	20
Estriol (E3)	10 ± 4	468 ± 30	+++	8–18	3
Estetrol (E4)	0.5 ± 0.2	?	Inactive	?	1
17α-Estradiol	4.2 ± 0.8	?	?	?	?
2-Hydroxyestradiol	24 ± 7	285 ± 8	+^{b}	31–61	28
2-Methoxyestradiol	0.05 ± 0.04	101	Inactive	?	130
4-Hydroxyestradiol	45 ± 12	?	?	?	?
4-Methoxyestradiol	1.3 ± 0.2	260	++	?	9
4-Fluoroestradiol^{a}	180 ± 43	?	+++	?	?
2-Hydroxyestrone	1.9 ± 0.8	130 ± 9	Inactive	110–142	8
2-Methoxyestrone	0.01 ± 0.00	103 ± 7	Inactive	95–100	120
4-Hydroxyestrone	11 ± 4	351	++	21–50	35
4-Methoxyestrone	0.13 ± 0.04	338	++	65–92	12
16α-Hydroxyestrone	2.8 ± 1.0	552 ± 42	+++	7–24	<0.5
2-Hydroxyestriol	0.9 ± 0.3	302	+^{b}	?	?
2-Methoxyestriol	0.01 ± 0.00	?	Inactive	?	4
Notes: Values are mean ± SD or range. ER RBA = Relative binding affinity to estrogen receptors of rat uterine cytosol. Uterine weight = Percentage change in uterine wet weight of ovariectomized rats after 72 hours with continuous administration of 1 μg/hour via subcutaneously implanted osmotic pumps. LH levels = Luteinizing hormone levels relative to baseline of ovariectomized rats after 24 to 72 hours of continuous administration via subcutaneous implant. Footnotes: ^{a} = Synthetic (i.e., not endogenous). ^{b} = Atypical uterotrophic effect which plateaus within 48 hours (estradiol's uterotrophy continues linearly up to 72 hours). Sources:

== See also ==
- 2-Methoxyestradiol
- Estrogen conjugate
- Lipoidal estrogen
