= 2-Hydroxyestradiol =

Names
- IUPAC name Estra-1,3,5(10)-triene-2,3,17β-triol
- Systematic IUPAC name (1S,3aS,3bR,9bS,11aS)-11a-Methyl-2,3,3a,3b,4,5,9b,10,11,11a-decahydro-1H-cyclopenta[a]phenanthrene-1,7,8-triol
- Other names 2-OHE2

Identifiers
CAS Number	362-05-0
3D model (JSmol)	Interactive image
ChemSpider	216475
ECHA InfoCard	100.160.393
PubChem CID	247304
UNII	AYU2L67YUU
CompTox Dashboard (EPA)	DTXSID3022372
- InChI: InChI=1S/C18H24O3/c1-18-7-6-11-12(14(18)4-5-17(18)21)3-2-10-8-15(19)16(20)9-13(10)11/h8-9,11-12,14,17,19-21H,2-7H2,1H3/t11-,12+,14-,17-,18-/m0/s1
- SMILES: Oc1c(O)cc2[C@H]3CC[C@]4(C)[C@]5(CC[C@H]4[C@@H]3CCc2c1).O5

Properties
Chemical formula	C_{18}H_{24}O_{3}
Molar mass	288.387 g·mol^{−1}
- Except where otherwise noted, data are given for materials in their standard state (at 25 °C [77 °F], 100 kPa). Infobox references

2-Hydroxyestradiol (2-OHE2), also known as estra-1,3,5(10)-triene-2,3,17β-triol, is an endogenous steroid, catechol estrogen, and metabolite of estradiol, as well as a positional isomer of estriol.

== Biosynthesis ==
Transformation of estradiol to 2-hydroxyestradiol is a major metabolic pathway of estradiol in the liver. CYP1A2 and CYP3A4 are the major enzymes catalyzing the 2-hydroxylation of estradiol. Conversion of estradiol into 2-hydroxyestradiol has also been detected in the uterus, breast, kidney, brain, and pituitary gland, as well as the placenta, and may similarly be mediated by cytochrome P450 enzymes. Although estradiol is extensively converted into 2-hydroxyestradiol, circulating levels of 2-hydroxyestradiol and levels of 2-hydroxyestradiol in various tissues are very low. This may be due to rapid conjugation (O-methylation, glucuronidation, sulfonation) of 2-hydroxyestradiol followed by urinary excretion.

== Biological activity ==
=== Estrogenic activity ===
2-Hydroxyestradiol has approximately 7% and 11% of the affinity of estradiol at the estrogen receptors (ERs) ERα and ERβ, respectively. It dissociates from the estrogen receptors more rapidly than does estradiol. The steroid is only very weakly estrogenic, and is able to antagonize the estrogenic effects of estradiol, indicating that its intrinsic activity at the estrogen receptor is less than that of estradiol and hence that it possesses the profile of a selective estrogen receptor modulator. It shows estrogenic activity in human breast cancer cells. In addition to its activity at the nuclear ERs, 2-hydroxyestradiol is an antagonist of the G protein-coupled estrogen receptor (GPER) (100–1,000 μM).

Selected biological properties of endogenous estrogens in rats
Estrogen	ER RBA (%)	Uterine weight (%)	Uterotrophy	LH levels (%)	SHBG RBA (%)
Control	–	100	–	100	–
Estradiol (E2)	100	506 ± 20	+++	12–19	100
Estrone (E1)	11 ± 8	490 ± 22	+++	?	20
Estriol (E3)	10 ± 4	468 ± 30	+++	8–18	3
Estetrol (E4)	0.5 ± 0.2	?	Inactive	?	1
17α-Estradiol	4.2 ± 0.8	?	?	?	?
2-Hydroxyestradiol	24 ± 7	285 ± 8	+^{b}	31–61	28
2-Methoxyestradiol	0.05 ± 0.04	101	Inactive	?	130
4-Hydroxyestradiol	45 ± 12	?	?	?	?
4-Methoxyestradiol	1.3 ± 0.2	260	++	?	9
4-Fluoroestradiol^{a}	180 ± 43	?	+++	?	?
2-Hydroxyestrone	1.9 ± 0.8	130 ± 9	Inactive	110–142	8
2-Methoxyestrone	0.01 ± 0.00	103 ± 7	Inactive	95–100	120
4-Hydroxyestrone	11 ± 4	351	++	21–50	35
4-Methoxyestrone	0.13 ± 0.04	338	++	65–92	12
16α-Hydroxyestrone	2.8 ± 1.0	552 ± 42	+++	7–24	<0.5
2-Hydroxyestriol	0.9 ± 0.3	302	+^{b}	?	?
2-Methoxyestriol	0.01 ± 0.00	?	Inactive	?	4
Notes: Values are mean ± SD or range. ER RBA = Relative binding affinity to estrogen receptors of rat uterine cytosol. Uterine weight = Percentage change in uterine wet weight of ovariectomized rats after 72 hours with continuous administration of 1 μg/hour via subcutaneously implanted osmotic pumps. LH levels = Luteinizing hormone levels relative to baseline of ovariectomized rats after 24 to 72 hours of continuous administration via subcutaneous implant. Footnotes: ^{a} = Synthetic (i.e., not endogenous). ^{b} = Atypical uterotrophic effect which plateaus within 48 hours (estradiol's uterotrophy continues linearly up to 72 hours). Sources:

=== Catecholaminergic activity ===
2-Hydroxyestradiol is a catechol estrogen and in this regard bears some structural resemblance to the catecholamines dopamine, norepinephrine (noradrenaline), and epinephrine (adrenaline). In accordance, 2-hydroxyestradiol has been found to interact with catecholamine systems. The steroid is known to compete with catecholamines for binding to catechol O-methyltransferase and tyrosine hydroxylase and to directly and competitively inhibit these enzymes. In addition, 2-hydroxyestradiol has been found to displace spiperone from the D_{2} receptor with approximately 50% of the affinity of dopamine, whereas estradiol, estrone, and estriol and their other 2-hydroxylated and 2-methoxylated derivatives showed only weak or negligible inhibition. Moreover, 2-hydroxyestradiol has been found to bind to the α_{1}-adrenergic receptor with slightly more than half the affinity of norepinephrine. However, although these affinities are comparable to those of dopamine and norepinephrine, they are nonetheless in the double-digit micromolar range.

2-Hydroxyestradiol has been found to increase prolactin secretion when administered intravenously to women. It was noted that this could be due to 2-hydroxyestradiol binding to and antagonizing the D_{2} receptor. However, the researchers argued against this possibility because it was delayed (by several hours) and of relatively small magnitude, whereas established D_{2} receptor antagonists promptly induce marked increases in prolactin levels. The researchers also argued against the possibility that it was due to inhibition of dopamine biosynthesis by 2-hydroxyestradiol because 2-hydroxyestrone, which inhibits tyrosine hydroxylase similarly to 2-hydroxyestradiol, showed no such increase in prolactin secretion. The researchers concluded that the most likely explanation was that the increase was mediated by the estrogenic activity of 2-hydroxyestradiol, as similar increments in prolactin levels had been observed with estradiol. In any case, these findings argue against the notion of major interactions of 2-hydroxyestradiol with the dopamine system.

=== Genotoxicity ===
2-Hydroxyestradiol, as well as 2-hydroxyestrone and 4-hydroxyestradiol, can undergo metabolic redox cycling to generate free radicals like superoxide and reactive estrogen semiquinone/quinone intermediates. These metabolites may damage DNA and other cellular components. However, 2-hydroxyestradiol shows little or no tumorigenic activity in the male Syrian hamster kidney and there is evidence that 2-hydroxyestradiol may actually decrease tumorigenesis in estrogen-sensitive tissues. It has been suggested that the lack of tumorigenesis of 2-hydroxyestrone is due to its rapid clearance. In addition, its metabolite 2-methoxyestradiol is a very potent inhibitor of tumor growth and angiogenesis, and this may contribute as well.

=== Production of 2-methoxyestradiol ===
2-Hydroxyestradiol has been identified as a prodrug of 2-methoxyestradiol, a transformation which is very efficiently catalyzed by catechol O-methyltransferase in the liver. 2-Methoxyestradiol is not estrogenic but is a potent angiogenesis inhibitor and agonist of the GPER with potential therapeutic implications in cancer.

=== Antioxidant activity ===
Similarly to other steroidal estrogens, 2-hydroxyestradiol is an antioxidant, but the catechol estrogens (2- and 4-hydroxylated estrogens) like 2-hydroxyestradiol are considered to be the most potent in terms of antioxidant activity.

In FENIX (fluorescence-enabled inhibited autoxidation) assays, a potent radical trapping antioxidant (RTA) activity of 2-hydroxyestradiol and 4-hydroxyestradiol was confirmed. Via this potent RTA activity, these molecules can exert a direct inhibition of ferroptosis, an iron-dependent cell death.

== History ==
2-Hydroxyestradiol was identified as a metabolite of estradiol in 1960.
