= 4-Hydroxyestrone =

Names
- IUPAC name 3,4-Dihydroxyestra-1,3,5(10)-trien-17-one
- Systematic IUPAC name (3aS,3bR,9bS,11aS)-6,7-Dihydroxy-11a-methyl-2,3,3a,3b,4,5,9b,10,11,11a-decahydro-1H-cyclopenta[a]phenanthren-1-one
- Other names 4-OHE1; Estra-1,3,5(10)-triene-3,4-diol-17-one

Identifiers
CAS Number	3131-23-5
3D model (JSmol)	Interactive image
ChEBI	CHEBI:87602
ChEMBL	ChEMBL1743300
ChemSpider	8146843
PubChem CID	9971251
UNII	3MN57C55S2
CompTox Dashboard (EPA)	DTXSID00904312
- InChI: InChI=1S/C18H22O3/c1-18-9-8-11-10-4-6-15(19)17(21)13(10)3-2-12(11)14(18)5-7-16(18)20/h4,6,11-12,14,19,21H,2-3,5,7-9H2,1H3/t11-,12-,14+,18+/m1/s1 Key: XQZVQQZZOVBNLU-QDTBLXIISA-N
- SMILES: Oc1ccc2[C@H]3CC[C@]4(C)C(CC[C@H]4[C@@H]3CCc2c1O)=O

Properties
Chemical formula	C_{18}H_{22}O_{3}
Molar mass	286.371 g·mol^{−1}
- Except where otherwise noted, data are given for materials in their standard state (at 25 °C [77 °F], 100 kPa). Infobox references

4-Hydroxyestrone (4-OHE1), also known as estra-1,3,5(10)-triene-3,4-diol-17-one, is an endogenous, naturally occurring catechol estrogen, neuroestrogen and a minor metabolite of estrone and estradiol. It is estrogenic, similarly to many other hydroxylated estrogen metabolites such as 2-hydroxyestradiol, 16α-hydroxyestrone, estriol (16α-hydroxyestradiol), and 4-hydroxyestradiol but unlike 2-hydroxyestrone. 4-OHE1 is also categorized as a carcinogen.

Selected biological properties of endogenous estrogens in rats
Estrogen	ER RBA (%)	Uterine weight (%)	Uterotrophy	LH levels (%)	SHBG RBA (%)
Control	–	100	–	100	–
Estradiol (E2)	100	506 ± 20	+++	12–19	100
Estrone (E1)	11 ± 8	490 ± 22	+++	?	20
Estriol (E3)	10 ± 4	468 ± 30	+++	8–18	3
Estetrol (E4)	0.5 ± 0.2	?	Inactive	?	1
17α-Estradiol	4.2 ± 0.8	?	?	?	?
2-Hydroxyestradiol	24 ± 7	285 ± 8	+^{b}	31–61	28
2-Methoxyestradiol	0.05 ± 0.04	101	Inactive	?	130
4-Hydroxyestradiol	45 ± 12	?	?	?	?
4-Methoxyestradiol	1.3 ± 0.2	260	++	?	9
4-Fluoroestradiol^{a}	180 ± 43	?	+++	?	?
2-Hydroxyestrone	1.9 ± 0.8	130 ± 9	Inactive	110–142	8
2-Methoxyestrone	0.01 ± 0.00	103 ± 7	Inactive	95–100	120
4-Hydroxyestrone	11 ± 4	351	++	21–50	35
4-Methoxyestrone	0.13 ± 0.04	338	++	65–92	12
16α-Hydroxyestrone	2.8 ± 1.0	552 ± 42	+++	7–24	<0.5
2-Hydroxyestriol	0.9 ± 0.3	302	+^{b}	?	?
2-Methoxyestriol	0.01 ± 0.00	?	Inactive	?	4
Notes: Values are mean ± SD or range. ER RBA = Relative binding affinity to estrogen receptors of rat uterine cytosol. Uterine weight = Percentage change in uterine wet weight of ovariectomized rats after 72 hours with continuous administration of 1 μg/hour via subcutaneously implanted osmotic pumps. LH levels = Luteinizing hormone levels relative to baseline of ovariectomized rats after 24 to 72 hours of continuous administration via subcutaneous implant. Footnotes: ^{a} = Synthetic (i.e., not endogenous). ^{b} = Atypical uterotrophic effect which plateaus within 48 hours (estradiol's uterotrophy continues linearly up to 72 hours). Sources:

== Chemical Structure Compared to Precursor ==
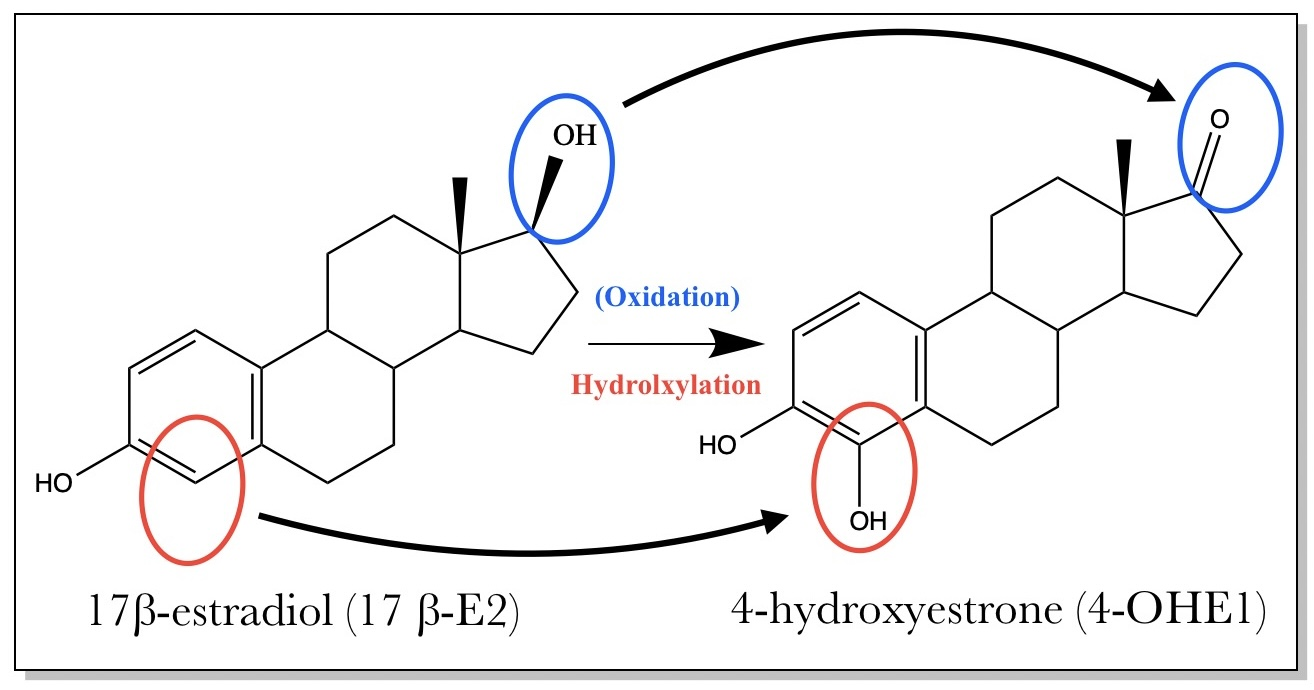
The hydroxylation (and indirect oxidation) of 17B-estradiol into 4-hydroxyestrone.

The chemical structure of 4-OHE1 is a hydroxylated and oxidized form of 17β-estradiol (17β-E2). Specifically the 4th position of the estrogen ring in 17β-E2 is hydroxylated and the 17th position of the . Structural comparisons between 4-OHE1 and 17β-E2 show a congruent steroid backbone, but the additional hydroxyl group in 4-OHE1 changes its biochemical properties. 4-OHE1 exhibits enhanced carcinogenic activities within the human body as compared to 17β-E2.

== Biochemical Studies Related to 4-OHE1's Role as a Carcinogen and Neuroestrogen ==
4-OHE1 behaves similarly to 17β-E2 in electron emission processes. A study on electron emission of 17β-E2 demonstrated that 4-OHE1, as a secondary metabolite, can emit electrons in a similar mechanism post-UV excitation. Additionally, studies related to the central nervous system (CNS) observed that the hydroxylation process in 17β-E2 also occurs in cerebral enzymes.

In 2019, 4-OHE1 was detected within human urine from breast cancer patients, reinforcing its association with cancer. Moreover, 4-OHE1 has been found to confer chemotherepeutic resistance, against docetaxel.

In 2020, studies comparing 17β-E2 and hydroxy esterone revealed that 4-OHE1 contributes to the cytoplasmic translocation of p53, a key tumor suppressor protein, contributing to its role in cellular responses from stress and damage.

In 2024, a study demonstrated 4-OHE1's role in cancer cell survival and its potential therapeutics for breast cancer treatment. 4-OHE1 acts as a ferroptosis inhibitor, a form of programmed cell death associated with cancer cell survival. Specifically, 4-OHE1 inhibits the protein disulfide isomerase (PDI), which is involved in the ferroptosis of specific breast cancer cells. By forming two hydrogen bonds with a crucial histidine residue in PDI, 4-OHE1 prevents cell death in these cells. Additionally, the 4-OHE1-PDI complex displays greater binding affinity but lower binding energy than a 17β-E2-PDI complex

Earlier research has indicated that natural estrogens can help protect the brain from oxidative harm. This current study aims to explore how different estrogen metabolites produced by the body can guard against neurotoxicity caused by oxidation, both in lab settings and in live subjects. When testing 25 endogenous estrogen metabolites using mouse hippocampal neuron cells, researchers found that 4-hydroxyestrone—a metabolite of estrone with minimal estrogen-like activity—was surprisingly effective at shielding neurons from oxidative stress. It even outperformed 17β-estradiol! Likewise, when looking at rats exposed to kanic acid-induced damage in their hippocampus, 4-hydroxyestrone showed a stronger protective effect compared to 17β-estradiol as well. The way it works is linked to an increase in p53 movement within cells due to SIRT1-mediated deacetylation of p53. Further examination of brain enzymes revealed that converting estrogens into their hydroxylated forms is a key metabolic route within the central nervous system. All these findings point towards 4-hydroxyestrone being a powerful neuroestrogen capable of providing significant protection against neuronal oxidative injury.

Hydroxyestrone (4-OHE1), a well-known cancer-causing metabolite that comes from 17β-estradiol (17β-E2), was picked as the subject for these studies. The goal was to dig deeper into how it kicks off cancer development. It turns out that when 4-OHE1 is energized in its singlet state using monochromatic UV light at a wavelength of 254 nm within polar environments like a water-ethanol mix (40:60 vol%), it can actually release electrons (e aq -).

== See also ==
- Estrogen conjugate
- Lipoidal estradiol
- 17β-estradiol (another name for Estradiol or E2)
