= 4-Hydroxyestradiol =

Names
- IUPAC name Estra-1,3,5(10)-triene-3,4,17β-triol
- Systematic IUPAC name (1S,3aS,3bR,9bS,11aS)-11a-Methyl-2,3,3a,3b,4,5,9b,10,11,11a-decahydro-1H-cyclopenta[a]phenanthrene-1,6,7-triol
- Other names 4-OHE2; 3,4,17β-Trihydroxyestra-1,3,5(10)-triene

Identifiers
CAS Number	5976-61-4
3D model (JSmol)	Interactive image
ChEBI	CHEBI:62845
ChEMBL	ChEMBL1412489
ChemSpider	4445523
ECHA InfoCard	100.165.080
KEGG	C14209
PubChem CID	5282360
UNII	C3ZO03450E
CompTox Dashboard (EPA)	DTXSID3022374
- InChI: InChI=1S/C18H24O3/c1-18-9-8-11-10-4-6-15(19)17(21)13(10)3-2-12(11)14(18)5-7-16(18)20/h4,6,11-12,14,16,19-21H,2-3,5,7-9H2,1H3/t11-,12-,14+,16+,18+/m1/s1 Key: QOZFCKXEVSGWGS-ZHIYBZGJSA-N
- SMILES: Oc1ccc2[C@H]3CC[C@]4(C)[C@]5(CC[C@H]4[C@@H]3CCc2c1O).O5

Properties
Chemical formula	C_{18}H_{24}O_{3}
Molar mass	288.387 g·mol^{−1}
- Except where otherwise noted, data are given for materials in their standard state (at 25 °C [77 °F], 100 kPa). Infobox references

4-Hydroxyestradiol (4-OHE2), also known as estra-1,3,5(10)-triene-3,4,17β-triol, is an endogenous, naturally occurring catechol estrogen and a minor metabolite of estradiol. It is estrogenic, similarly to many other hydroxylated estrogen metabolites such as 2-hydroxyestradiol, 16α-hydroxyestrone, estriol (16α-hydroxyestradiol), and 4-hydroxyestrone but unlike 2-hydroxyestrone.

Selected biological properties of endogenous estrogens in rats
Estrogen	ER RBA (%)	Uterine weight (%)	Uterotrophy	LH levels (%)	SHBG RBA (%)
Control	–	100	–	100	–
Estradiol (E2)	100	506 ± 20	+++	12–19	100
Estrone (E1)	11 ± 8	490 ± 22	+++	?	20
Estriol (E3)	10 ± 4	468 ± 30	+++	8–18	3
Estetrol (E4)	0.5 ± 0.2	?	Inactive	?	1
17α-Estradiol	4.2 ± 0.8	?	?	?	?
2-Hydroxyestradiol	24 ± 7	285 ± 8	+^{b}	31–61	28
2-Methoxyestradiol	0.05 ± 0.04	101	Inactive	?	130
4-Hydroxyestradiol	45 ± 12	?	?	?	?
4-Methoxyestradiol	1.3 ± 0.2	260	++	?	9
4-Fluoroestradiol^{a}	180 ± 43	?	+++	?	?
2-Hydroxyestrone	1.9 ± 0.8	130 ± 9	Inactive	110–142	8
2-Methoxyestrone	0.01 ± 0.00	103 ± 7	Inactive	95–100	120
4-Hydroxyestrone	11 ± 4	351	++	21–50	35
4-Methoxyestrone	0.13 ± 0.04	338	++	65–92	12
16α-Hydroxyestrone	2.8 ± 1.0	552 ± 42	+++	7–24	<0.5
2-Hydroxyestriol	0.9 ± 0.3	302	+^{b}	?	?
2-Methoxyestriol	0.01 ± 0.00	?	Inactive	?	4
Notes: Values are mean ± SD or range. ER RBA = Relative binding affinity to estrogen receptors of rat uterine cytosol. Uterine weight = Percentage change in uterine wet weight of ovariectomized rats after 72 hours with continuous administration of 1 μg/hour via subcutaneously implanted osmotic pumps. LH levels = Luteinizing hormone levels relative to baseline of ovariectomized rats after 24 to 72 hours of continuous administration via subcutaneous implant. Footnotes: ^{a} = Synthetic (i.e., not endogenous). ^{b} = Atypical uterotrophic effect which plateaus within 48 hours (estradiol's uterotrophy continues linearly up to 72 hours). Sources:

== See also ==
- Estrogen conjugate
- Lipoidal estradiol
