= MP-2001 =

Chemical compound

Identifiers
- IUPAC name: (8R,9S,13S,14S,17S)-2,3,4-Trimethoxy-13-methyl-6,7,8,9,11,12,14,15,16,17-decahydrocyclopenta[a]phenanthren-17-ol
- CAS Number: 4314-54-9
- PubChem CID: 22296422
- ChemSpider: 20055759
- UNII: YT76GY6AFD
- CompTox Dashboard (EPA): DTXSID401046849

Chemical and physical data
- Formula: C_{21}H_{30}O_{4}
- Molar mass: 346.467 g·mol^{−1}
- 3D model (JSmol): Interactive image
- SMILES: C[C@]12CC[C@H]3[C@H]([C@@H]1CC[C@@H]2O)CCC4=C(C(=C(C=C34)OC)OC)OC
- InChI: InChI=1S/C21H30O4/c1-21-10-9-12-13(16(21)7-8-18(21)22)5-6-14-15(12)11-17(23-2)20(25-4)19(14)24-3/h11-13,16,18,22H,5-10H2,1-4H3/t12-,13+,16-,18-,21-/m0/s1; Key:HRVXCJHYWIFSOQ-LEZVPBBQSA-N

MP-2001, also known as 2,3,4-trimethoxyestra-1,3,5(10)-trien-17β-ol or 2,4-dimethoxyestradiol 3-methyl ether, is a steroid and derivative of estradiol that was described in 1966 and is devoid of estrogenic activity but produces potent analgesic effects in animals. It was never marketed.

== See also ==
- 2-Methoxyestradiol
- 4-Methoxyestradiol
