= 2-Hydroxyestriol =

Names
- IUPAC name Estra-1,3,5(10)-triene-2,3,16α,17β-tetrol
- Systematic IUPAC name (1R,2R,3aS,3bR,9bS,11aS)-11a-Methyl-2,3,3a,3b,4,5,9b,10,11,11a-decahydro-1H-cyclopenta[a]phenanthrene-1,2,7,8-tetrol

Identifiers
| CAS Number | 1232-80-0 |
| 3D model (JSmol) | Interactive image |
| ChemSpider | 8510654 |
| PubChem CID | 10335195 |
| UNII | XS3NDJ547R |
| CompTox Dashboard (EPA) | DTXSID10924400 |
- InChI: InChI=1S/C18H24O4/c1-18-5-4-10-11(13(18)8-16(21)17(18)22)3-2-9-6-14(19)15(20)7-12(9)10/h6-7,10-11,13,16-17,19-22H,2-5,8H2,1H3/t10-,11+,13-,16+,17-,18-/m0/s1 Key: ZUGCDOZAVASBQT-SLVREZFOSA-N
- SMILES: Oc1c(O)cc2[C@H]3CC[C@]4(C)[C@]5([C@@]6C[C@H]4[C@@H]3CCc2c1).O6.O5

Properties
| Chemical formula | C_{18}H_{24}O_{4} |
| Molar mass | 304.386 g·mol^{−1} |

Hazards
- GHS labelling
| Hazard statements | H351 |
| Precautionary statements | P201, P202, P281, P308+P313, P405, P501 |
- Except where otherwise noted, data are given for materials in their standard state (at 25 °C [77 °F], 100 kPa). Infobox references

2-Hydroxyestriol, also known as estra-1,3,5(10)-triene-2,3,16α,17β-tetrol, is an endogenous catechol estrogen and metabolite of estriol. It is a suspected carcinogen of carcinogenicity category 2.

Selected biological properties of endogenous estrogens in rats
| Estrogen | ER RBA (%) | Uterine weight (%) | Uterotrophy | LH levels (%) | SHBG RBA (%) |
|---|---|---|---|---|---|
| Control | – | 100 | – | 100 | – |
| Estradiol (E2) | 100 | 506 ± 20 | +++ | 12–19 | 100 |
| Estrone (E1) | 11 ± 8 | 490 ± 22 | +++ | ? | 20 |
| Estriol (E3) | 10 ± 4 | 468 ± 30 | +++ | 8–18 | 3 |
| Estetrol (E4) | 0.5 ± 0.2 | ? | Inactive | ? | 1 |
| 17α-Estradiol | 4.2 ± 0.8 | ? | ? | ? | ? |
| 2-Hydroxyestradiol | 24 ± 7 | 285 ± 8 | +^{b} | 31–61 | 28 |
| 2-Methoxyestradiol | 0.05 ± 0.04 | 101 | Inactive | ? | 130 |
| 4-Hydroxyestradiol | 45 ± 12 | ? | ? | ? | ? |
| 4-Methoxyestradiol | 1.3 ± 0.2 | 260 | ++ | ? | 9 |
| 4-Fluoroestradiol^{a} | 180 ± 43 | ? | +++ | ? | ? |
| 2-Hydroxyestrone | 1.9 ± 0.8 | 130 ± 9 | Inactive | 110–142 | 8 |
| 2-Methoxyestrone | 0.01 ± 0.00 | 103 ± 7 | Inactive | 95–100 | 120 |
| 4-Hydroxyestrone | 11 ± 4 | 351 | ++ | 21–50 | 35 |
| 4-Methoxyestrone | 0.13 ± 0.04 | 338 | ++ | 65–92 | 12 |
| 16α-Hydroxyestrone | 2.8 ± 1.0 | 552 ± 42 | +++ | 7–24 | <0.5 |
| 2-Hydroxyestriol | 0.9 ± 0.3 | 302 | +^{b} | ? | ? |
| 2-Methoxyestriol | 0.01 ± 0.00 | ? | Inactive | ? | 4 |
Notes: Values are mean ± SD or range. ER RBA = Relative binding affinity to estrogen receptors of rat uterine cytosol. Uterine weight = Percentage change in uterine wet weight of ovariectomized rats after 72 hours with continuous administration of 1 μg/hour via subcutaneously implanted osmotic pumps. LH levels = Luteinizing hormone levels relative to baseline of ovariectomized rats after 24 to 72 hours of continuous administration via subcutaneous implant. Footnotes: ^{a} = Synthetic (i.e., not endogenous). ^{b} = Atypical uterotrophic effect which plateaus within 48 hours (estradiol's uterotrophy continues linearly up to 72 hours). Sources:

== See also ==
- 4-Hydroxyestriol
- 2-Methoxyestriol
