= 16α-Hydroxyestrone =

Names
- IUPAC name 3,16α-Dihydroxyestra-1,3,5(10)-trien-17-one
- Systematic IUPAC name (2R,3aS,3bR,9bS,11aS)-2,7-Dihydroxy-11a-methyl-2,3,3a,3b,4,5,9b,10,11,11a-decahydro-1H-cyclopenta[a]phenanthren-1-one
- Other names Hydroxyestrone; 16-Hydroxyestrone

Identifiers
CAS Number	566-76-7
3D model (JSmol)	Interactive image
ChEBI	CHEBI:776
ChemSpider	103012
ECHA InfoCard	100.164.941
PubChem CID	115116
UNII	JY611949JU
CompTox Dashboard (EPA)	DTXSID901047947
- InChI: InChI=1S/C18H22O3/c1-18-7-6-13-12-5-3-11(19)8-10(12)2-4-14(13)15(18)9-16(20)17(18)21/h3,5,8,13-16,19-20H,2,4,6-7,9H2,1H3/t13-,14-,15+,16-,18+/m1/s1
- SMILES: Oc1ccc2[C@H]3CC[C@]4(C)C([C@@]6C[C@H]4[C@@H]3CCc2c1)=O.O6

Properties
Chemical formula	C_{18}H_{22}O_{3}
Molar mass	286.371 g·mol^{−1}
- Except where otherwise noted, data are given for materials in their standard state (at 25 °C [77 °F], 100 kPa). Infobox references

16α-Hydroxyestrone (16α-OH-E1), or hydroxyestrone, also known as estra-1,3,5(10)-triene-3,16α-diol-17-one, is an endogenous steroidal estrogen and a major metabolite of estrone, as well as an intermediate in the biosynthesis of estriol. It is a potent estrogen similarly to estrone, and it has been suggested that the ratio of 16α-hydroxyestrone to 2-hydroxyestrone, the latter being much less estrogenic in comparison and even antiestrogenic in the presence of more potent estrogens like estradiol, may be involved in the pathophysiology of breast cancer. Conversely, 16α-hydroxyestrone may help to protect against osteoporosis.

In terms of relative binding affinity (RBA) for the rat uterine estrogen receptor, 16α-hydroxyestrone showed 2.8% of the affinity of estradiol. For comparison, estrone had 11% of the affinity and estriol had 10% of the affinity of estradiol. In contrast to other estrogens, the binding of 16α-hydroxyestrone to the estrogen receptor is reported to be covalent and irreversible. 16α-Hydroxyestrone has been reported to have 25% of the vaginal estrogenic potency of estradiol. The maximal uterotrophic and antigonadotropic effect of 16α-hydroxyestrone was equivalent to those of estradiol and estriol, indicating that 16α-hydroxyestrone is a fully effective estrogen. However, 16α-hydroxyestrone was much less potent than estradiol or estrone.

The C3 and C16α diacetate ester of 16α-hydroxyestrone, hydroxyestrone diacetate (brand names Colpoginon, Colpormon, Hormobion, and Hormocervix), has been marketed and used medically as an estrogen in Europe.

Selected biological properties of endogenous estrogens in rats
Estrogen	ER RBA (%)	Uterine weight (%)	Uterotrophy	LH levels (%)	SHBG RBA (%)
Control	–	100	–	100	–
Estradiol (E2)	100	506 ± 20	+++	12–19	100
Estrone (E1)	11 ± 8	490 ± 22	+++	?	20
Estriol (E3)	10 ± 4	468 ± 30	+++	8–18	3
Estetrol (E4)	0.5 ± 0.2	?	Inactive	?	1
17α-Estradiol	4.2 ± 0.8	?	?	?	?
2-Hydroxyestradiol	24 ± 7	285 ± 8	+^{b}	31–61	28
2-Methoxyestradiol	0.05 ± 0.04	101	Inactive	?	130
4-Hydroxyestradiol	45 ± 12	?	?	?	?
4-Methoxyestradiol	1.3 ± 0.2	260	++	?	9
4-Fluoroestradiol^{a}	180 ± 43	?	+++	?	?
2-Hydroxyestrone	1.9 ± 0.8	130 ± 9	Inactive	110–142	8
2-Methoxyestrone	0.01 ± 0.00	103 ± 7	Inactive	95–100	120
4-Hydroxyestrone	11 ± 4	351	++	21–50	35
4-Methoxyestrone	0.13 ± 0.04	338	++	65–92	12
16α-Hydroxyestrone	2.8 ± 1.0	552 ± 42	+++	7–24	<0.5
2-Hydroxyestriol	0.9 ± 0.3	302	+^{b}	?	?
2-Methoxyestriol	0.01 ± 0.00	?	Inactive	?	4
Notes: Values are mean ± SD or range. ER RBA = Relative binding affinity to estrogen receptors of rat uterine cytosol. Uterine weight = Percentage change in uterine wet weight of ovariectomized rats after 72 hours with continuous administration of 1 μg/hour via subcutaneously implanted osmotic pumps. LH levels = Luteinizing hormone levels relative to baseline of ovariectomized rats after 24 to 72 hours of continuous administration via subcutaneous implant. Footnotes: ^{a} = Synthetic (i.e., not endogenous). ^{b} = Atypical uterotrophic effect which plateaus within 48 hours (estradiol's uterotrophy continues linearly up to 72 hours). Sources:

== See also ==
- 2-Hydroxyestrone
- 2-Hydroxyestradiol
- 16β-Hydroxyestrone
- 16-Ketoestrone
- 16α-Hydroxydehydroepiandrosterone
- 16α-Hydroxyandrostenedione
- 15α-Hydroxydehydroepiandrosterone
