= 4-Hydroxyestriol =

Names
- IUPAC name Estra-1,3,5(10)-triene-3,4,16α,17β-tetrol
- Systematic IUPAC name (1R,2R,3aS,3bR,9bS,11aS)-11a-Methyl-2,3,3a,3b,4,5,9b,10,11,11a-decahydro-1H-cyclopenta[a]phenanthrene-1,2,6,7-tetrol

Identifiers
CAS Number	60021-32-1
3D model (JSmol)	Interactive image
ChemSpider	168415
PubChem CID	194095
UNII	I8867W65UC
CompTox Dashboard (EPA)	DTXSID20975448
- InChI: InChI=1S/C18H24O4/c1-18-7-6-10-9-4-5-14(19)16(21)12(9)3-2-11(10)13(18)8-15(20)17(18)22/h4-5,10-11,13,15,17,19-22H,2-3,6-8H2,1H3/t10-,11-,13+,15-,17+,18+/m1/s1 Key: KKXSCWWODCABHQ-OZPBLJIJSA-N
- SMILES: C[C@]12CC[C@H]3[C@H]([C@@H]1C[C@H]([C@@H]2O)O)CCC4=C3C=CC(=C4O)O

Properties
Chemical formula	C_{18}H_{24}O_{4}
Molar mass	304.386 g·mol^{−1}
- Except where otherwise noted, data are given for materials in their standard state (at 25 °C [77 °F], 100 kPa). Infobox references

4-Hydroxyestriol, also known as estra-1,3,5(10)-triene-3,4,16α,17β-tetrol, is an endogenous catechol estrogen and metabolite of estriol. It has been found in pregnancy urine.

== See also ==
- 2-Hydroxyestriol
