= 4-Methoxyestrone =

Names
- IUPAC name 3-Hydroxy-4-methoxyestra-1,3,5(10)-trien-17-one
- Systematic IUPAC name (3aS,3bR,9bS,11aS)-7-Hydroxy-6-methoxy-11a-methyl-2,3,3a,3b,4,5,9b,10,11,11a-decahydro-1H-cyclopenta[a]phenanthren-1-one
- Other names 4-ME1; 4-MeOE1; 4-MeO-E1; 4-Hydroxyestrone 4-methyl ether

Identifiers
CAS Number	58562-33-7
3D model (JSmol)	Interactive image
ChEBI	CHEBI:136972
ChEMBL	ChEMBL1627349
ChemSpider	168393
PubChem CID	194066
UNII	EX27GM9MHY
CompTox Dashboard (EPA)	DTXSID40904316
- InChI: InChI=1S/C19H24O3/c1-19-10-9-12-11-5-7-16(20)18(22-2)14(11)4-3-13(12)15(19)6-8-17(19)21/h5,7,12-13,15,20H,3-4,6,8-10H2,1-2H3/t12-,13-,15+,19+/m1/s1 Key: PUEXVLNGOBYUEW-BFDPJXHCSA-N
- SMILES: C[C@]12CC[C@H]3[C@H]([C@@H]1CCC2=O)CCC4=C3C=CC(=C4OC)O

Properties
Chemical formula	C_{19}H_{24}O_{3}
Molar mass	300.398 g·mol^{−1}
- Except where otherwise noted, data are given for materials in their standard state (at 25 °C [77 °F], 100 kPa). Infobox references

4-Methoxyestrone (4-ME1) is an endogenous, naturally occurring methoxylated catechol estrogen and metabolite of estrone that is formed by catechol O-methyltransferase via the intermediate 4-hydroxyestrone. It has estrogenic activity similarly to estrone and 4-hydroxyestrone.

Selected biological properties of endogenous estrogens in rats
Estrogen	ER RBA (%)	Uterine weight (%)	Uterotrophy	LH levels (%)	SHBG RBA (%)
Control	–	100	–	100	–
Estradiol (E2)	100	506 ± 20	+++	12–19	100
Estrone (E1)	11 ± 8	490 ± 22	+++	?	20
Estriol (E3)	10 ± 4	468 ± 30	+++	8–18	3
Estetrol (E4)	0.5 ± 0.2	?	Inactive	?	1
17α-Estradiol	4.2 ± 0.8	?	?	?	?
2-Hydroxyestradiol	24 ± 7	285 ± 8	+^{b}	31–61	28
2-Methoxyestradiol	0.05 ± 0.04	101	Inactive	?	130
4-Hydroxyestradiol	45 ± 12	?	?	?	?
4-Methoxyestradiol	1.3 ± 0.2	260	++	?	9
4-Fluoroestradiol^{a}	180 ± 43	?	+++	?	?
2-Hydroxyestrone	1.9 ± 0.8	130 ± 9	Inactive	110–142	8
2-Methoxyestrone	0.01 ± 0.00	103 ± 7	Inactive	95–100	120
4-Hydroxyestrone	11 ± 4	351	++	21–50	35
4-Methoxyestrone	0.13 ± 0.04	338	++	65–92	12
16α-Hydroxyestrone	2.8 ± 1.0	552 ± 42	+++	7–24	<0.5
2-Hydroxyestriol	0.9 ± 0.3	302	+^{b}	?	?
2-Methoxyestriol	0.01 ± 0.00	?	Inactive	?	4
Notes: Values are mean ± SD or range. ER RBA = Relative binding affinity to estrogen receptors of rat uterine cytosol. Uterine weight = Percentage change in uterine wet weight of ovariectomized rats after 72 hours with continuous administration of 1 μg/hour via subcutaneously implanted osmotic pumps. LH levels = Luteinizing hormone levels relative to baseline of ovariectomized rats after 24 to 72 hours of continuous administration via subcutaneous implant. Footnotes: ^{a} = Synthetic (i.e., not endogenous). ^{b} = Atypical uterotrophic effect which plateaus within 48 hours (estradiol's uterotrophy continues linearly up to 72 hours). Sources:

== See also ==
- 2-Methoxyestradiol
- 2-Methoxyestriol
- 2-Methoxyestrone
- 4-Methoxyestradiol
