= 2-Methoxyestradiol =

Chemical compound

Clinical data
- Trade names: Panzem
- Other names: 2-ME2; 2-MeO-E2; 2-MeOE2; 2-Hydroxyestradiol 2-methyl ether; 2-Methoxyestra-1,3,5(10)-triene-3,17β-diol

Identifiers
- IUPAC name: (8R,9S,13S,14S,17S)-2-Methoxy-13-methyl-6,7,8,9,11,12,14,15,16,17-decahydrocyclopenta[a]phenanthrene-3,17-diol
- CAS Number: 362-07-2
- PubChem CID: 66414
- ChemSpider: 59788
- UNII: 6I2QW73SR5
- ChEBI: CHEBI:28955
- ChEMBL: ChEMBL299613
- CompTox Dashboard (EPA): DTXSID3040938
- ECHA InfoCard: 100.164.606

Chemical and physical data
- Formula: C_{19}H_{26}O_{3}
- Molar mass: 302.414 g·mol^{−1}
- 3D model (JSmol): Interactive image
- SMILES: Oc1c(OC)cc2[C@H]3CC[C@]4(C)[C@]5(CC[C@H]4[C@@H]3CCc2c1).O5
- InChI: InChI=1S/C19H26O3/c1-19-8-7-12-13(15(19)5-6-18(19)21)4-3-11-9-16(20)17(22-2)10-14(11)12/h9-10,12-13,15,18,20-21H,3-8H2,1-2H3/t12-,13+,15-,18-,19-/m0/s1; Key:CQOQDQWUFQDJMK-SSTWWWIQSA-N

2-Methoxyestradiol (2-ME2, 2-MeO-E2) is a natural metabolite of estradiol and 2-hydroxyestradiol (2-OHE2). It is specifically the 2-methyl ether of 2-hydroxyestradiol. 2-Methoxyestradiol prevents the formation of new blood vessels that tumors need in order to grow (angiogenesis), hence it is an angiogenesis inhibitor. It also acts as a vasodilator and induces apoptosis in some cancer cell lines. 2-Methoxyestradiol is derived from estradiol, although it interacts poorly with the estrogen receptors (2,000-fold lower activational potency relative to estradiol). However, it retains activity as a high-affinity agonist of the G protein-coupled estrogen receptor (GPER) (10 nM, relative to 3–6 nM for estradiol). It can also be used to treat alveolar echinococcosis when combined with albendazole.

Selected biological properties of endogenous estrogens in rats
Estrogen	ER RBA (%)	Uterine weight (%)	Uterotrophy	LH levels (%)	SHBG RBA (%)
Control	–	100	–	100	–
Estradiol (E2)	100	506 ± 20	+++	12–19	100
Estrone (E1)	11 ± 8	490 ± 22	+++	?	20
Estriol (E3)	10 ± 4	468 ± 30	+++	8–18	3
Estetrol (E4)	0.5 ± 0.2	?	Inactive	?	1
17α-Estradiol	4.2 ± 0.8	?	?	?	?
2-Hydroxyestradiol	24 ± 7	285 ± 8	+^{b}	31–61	28
2-Methoxyestradiol	0.05 ± 0.04	101	Inactive	?	130
4-Hydroxyestradiol	45 ± 12	?	?	?	?
4-Methoxyestradiol	1.3 ± 0.2	260	++	?	9
4-Fluoroestradiol^{a}	180 ± 43	?	+++	?	?
2-Hydroxyestrone	1.9 ± 0.8	130 ± 9	Inactive	110–142	8
2-Methoxyestrone	0.01 ± 0.00	103 ± 7	Inactive	95–100	120
4-Hydroxyestrone	11 ± 4	351	++	21–50	35
4-Methoxyestrone	0.13 ± 0.04	338	++	65–92	12
16α-Hydroxyestrone	2.8 ± 1.0	552 ± 42	+++	7–24	<0.5
2-Hydroxyestriol	0.9 ± 0.3	302	+^{b}	?	?
2-Methoxyestriol	0.01 ± 0.00	?	Inactive	?	4
Notes: Values are mean ± SD or range. ER RBA = Relative binding affinity to estrogen receptors of rat uterine cytosol. Uterine weight = Percentage change in uterine wet weight of ovariectomized rats after 72 hours with continuous administration of 1 μg/hour via subcutaneously implanted osmotic pumps. LH levels = Luteinizing hormone levels relative to baseline of ovariectomized rats after 24 to 72 hours of continuous administration via subcutaneous implant. Footnotes: ^{a} = Synthetic (i.e., not endogenous). ^{b} = Atypical uterotrophic effect which plateaus within 48 hours (estradiol's uterotrophy continues linearly up to 72 hours). Sources:

== Clinical development ==
2-Methoxyestradiol was being developed as an experimental drug candidate with the tentative brand name Panzem. It has undergone Phase 1 clinical trials against breast cancer. A phase II trial of 18 advanced ovarian cancer patients reported encouraging results in October 2007.

Preclinical models also suggest that 2-methoxyestradiol could also be effective against inflammatory diseases such as rheumatoid arthritis. Several studies have been conducted showing 2-methoxyestradiol is a microtubule inhibitor and is inhibitory against prostate cancer in rodents.

As of 2015, all clinical development of 2-methoxyestradiol has been suspended or discontinued. This is significantly due to the very poor oral bioavailability of the molecule and also due to its extensive metabolism. Analogues have been developed in an attempt to overcome these problems. An example is 2-methoxyestradiol disulfamate (STX-140), the C3 and C17β disulfamate ester of 2-methoxyestradiol.

== Clinical effects ==
2-Methoxyestradiol was found to increase sex hormone-binding globulin (SHBG) levels in men by 2.5-fold at a dose of 400 mg/day and by 4-fold at a dose of 1,200 mg/day. Conversely, it did not seem to suppress testosterone levels.

A study in 2000 indicated that 2-methoxyestradiol induces G2/M cycle arrest, apoptosis and the disruption of thyroid follicles. This process results in the release of thyroid antigens that may play a role in high incidence of thyroid autoantibodies and autoimmune thyroid disease in women.

== See also ==
- 2-Methoxyestriol
- 2-Methoxyestrone
- 4-Methoxyestradiol
- 4-Methoxyestrone
- MP-2001
