= 4-Methoxyestradiol =

Names
- IUPAC name 4-Methoxyestra-1,3,5(10)-triene-3,17β-diol
- Systematic IUPAC name (1S,3aS,3bR,9bS,11aS)-6-Methoxy-11a-methyl-2,3,3a,3b,4,5,9b,10,11,11a-decahydro-1H-cyclopenta[a]phenanthrene-1,7-diol
- Other names 4-ME2; 4-MeOE2; 4-MeO-E2; 4-Methoxy-17β-estradiol; Estra-1,3,5(10)-trien-3,4,17β-triol 4-methyl ether

Identifiers
CAS Number	26788-23-8
3D model (JSmol)	Interactive image
ChEBI	CHEBI:136975
ChemSpider	61848
PubChem CID	68578
UNII	R6YV5Q2LKS
CompTox Dashboard (EPA)	DTXSID50949596
- InChI: InChI=1S/C19H26O3/c1-19-10-9-12-11-5-7-16(20)18(22-2)14(11)4-3-13(12)15(19)6-8-17(19)21/h5,7,12-13,15,17,20-21H,3-4,6,8-10H2,1-2H3/t12-,13-,15+,17+,19+/m1/s1 Key: BCWZIZLVBYHFES-PYEWSWHRSA-N
- SMILES: Oc1ccc2[C@H]3CC[C@]4(C)[C@]5(CC[C@H]4[C@@H]3CCc2c1OC).O5

Properties
Chemical formula	C_{19}H_{26}O_{3}
Molar mass	302.414 g·mol^{−1}
- Except where otherwise noted, data are given for materials in their standard state (at 25 °C [77 °F], 100 kPa). Infobox references

4-Methoxyestradiol (4-ME2) is an endogenous, naturally occurring methoxylated catechol estrogen and metabolite of estradiol that is formed by catechol O-methyltransferase via the intermediate 4-hydroxyestradiol. It has estrogenic activity similarly to estrone and 4-hydroxyestrone.

Selected biological properties of endogenous estrogens in rats
Estrogen	ER RBA (%)	Uterine weight (%)	Uterotrophy	LH levels (%)	SHBG RBA (%)
Control	–	100	–	100	–
Estradiol (E2)	100	506 ± 20	+++	12–19	100
Estrone (E1)	11 ± 8	490 ± 22	+++	?	20
Estriol (E3)	10 ± 4	468 ± 30	+++	8–18	3
Estetrol (E4)	0.5 ± 0.2	?	Inactive	?	1
17α-Estradiol	4.2 ± 0.8	?	?	?	?
2-Hydroxyestradiol	24 ± 7	285 ± 8	+^{b}	31–61	28
2-Methoxyestradiol	0.05 ± 0.04	101	Inactive	?	130
4-Hydroxyestradiol	45 ± 12	?	?	?	?
4-Methoxyestradiol	1.3 ± 0.2	260	++	?	9
4-Fluoroestradiol^{a}	180 ± 43	?	+++	?	?
2-Hydroxyestrone	1.9 ± 0.8	130 ± 9	Inactive	110–142	8
2-Methoxyestrone	0.01 ± 0.00	103 ± 7	Inactive	95–100	120
4-Hydroxyestrone	11 ± 4	351	++	21–50	35
4-Methoxyestrone	0.13 ± 0.04	338	++	65–92	12
16α-Hydroxyestrone	2.8 ± 1.0	552 ± 42	+++	7–24	<0.5
2-Hydroxyestriol	0.9 ± 0.3	302	+^{b}	?	?
2-Methoxyestriol	0.01 ± 0.00	?	Inactive	?	4
Notes: Values are mean ± SD or range. ER RBA = Relative binding affinity to estrogen receptors of rat uterine cytosol. Uterine weight = Percentage change in uterine wet weight of ovariectomized rats after 72 hours with continuous administration of 1 μg/hour via subcutaneously implanted osmotic pumps. LH levels = Luteinizing hormone levels relative to baseline of ovariectomized rats after 24 to 72 hours of continuous administration via subcutaneous implant. Footnotes: ^{a} = Synthetic (i.e., not endogenous). ^{b} = Atypical uterotrophic effect which plateaus within 48 hours (estradiol's uterotrophy continues linearly up to 72 hours). Sources:

== See also ==
- 2-Methoxyestradiol
- 2-Methoxyestriol
- 2-Methoxyestrone
- 4-Methoxyestrone
