= Subcutaneous implant =

Implant under the skin for drug delivery

In medicine, a subcutaneous implant is an implant that is delivered under the skin into the subcutaneous tissue by surgery or injection and is used to deliver a drug for a long period of time. Examples of drugs that can be administered in this way include leuprorelin and the sex steroids estradiol and testosterone.
