= 17α-Ethynyl-3β-androstanediol =

Chemical compound

Clinical data
- Other names: HE-3539; HE3539; Ethinylandrostanediol; 17α-Ethynyl-5α-androstane-3β,17β-diol; 5α,17α-Pregn-20-yne-3β,17-diol
- Routes of administration: By mouth
- Drug class: Estrogen

Identifiers
- IUPAC name: (5S,8R,9S,10S,13S,14S,17R)-17-ethynyl-10,13-dimethyl-1,2,3,4,5,6,7,8,9,11,12,14,15,16-tetradecahydrocyclopenta[a]phenanthrene-3,17-diol
- CAS Number: 13611-96-6
- PubChem CID: 45042186

Chemical and physical data
- Formula: C_{21}H_{32}O_{2}
- Molar mass: 316.485 g·mol^{−1}
- 3D model (JSmol): Interactive image
- SMILES: C[C@]12CCC(C[C@@H]1CC[C@@H]3[C@@H]2CC[C@]4([C@H]3CC[C@]4(C#C)O)C)O
- InChI: InChI=1S/C21H32O2/c1-4-21(23)12-9-18-16-6-5-14-13-15(22)7-10-19(14,2)17(16)8-11-20(18,21)3/h1,14-18,22-23H,5-13H2,2-3H3/t14-,15?,16+,17-,18-,19-,20-,21-/m0/s1; Key:CKAXZOYFIHQCBN-KVECEQEYSA-N

17α-Ethynyl-3β-androstanediol (developmental code HE-3539; also known as 17α-ethynyl-5α-androstane-3β,17β-diol) is a synthetic estrogen and a 17α-substituted derivative of 3β-androstanediol which was never marketed.

17α-Ethynyl-3β-androstanediol shows high affinity for the estrogen receptors in vitro (IC_{50} values of 16 nM for ERα and 126 nM for ERβ relative to values of 8 nM at ERα and 7 nM at ERβ for estradiol), and activates the estrogen receptors in vitro (EC_{50} value of 0.9 nM relative to 0.002 nM for estradiol). It also has weak affinity for the androgen receptor in vitro (IC_{50} = 277 nM relative to 15 nM for dihydrotestosterone), but doesn't appear to activate the receptor. 17α-Ethynyl-3β-androstanediol may produce 17α-ethynyl-3α-androstanediol and 5α-dihydroethisterone (5α-dihydro-17α-ethynyltestosterone) as active metabolites in vivo. In accordance with its in-vitro estrogenic activity, 17α-ethynyl-3β-androstanediol produces estrogenic effects like uterotrophy and testicular atrophy in animals.

Esters of 17α-ethynyl-3β-androstanediol have been developed and studied.

17α-Ethynyl-3β-androstanediol is a positional isomer of 17α-ethynyl-3α-androstanediol, and is a metabolite of this compound in vivo via metabolic inversion of the position of the C3 hydroxyl group. It may be involved in the biological activity of 17α-ethynyl-3α-androstanediol.

Affinities of estrogen receptor ligands for the ERα and ERβ
Ligand	Other names	Relative binding affinities (RBA, %)^{a}		Absolute binding affinities (K_{i}, nM)^{a}		Action
Ligand	Other names	ERα	ERβ	ERα	ERβ	Action
Estradiol	E2; 17β-Estradiol	100	100	0.115 (0.04–0.24)	0.15 (0.10–2.08)	Estrogen
Estrone	E1; 17-Ketoestradiol	16.39 (0.7–60)	6.5 (1.36–52)	0.445 (0.3–1.01)	1.75 (0.35–9.24)	Estrogen
Estriol	E3; 16α-OH-17β-E2	12.65 (4.03–56)	26 (14.0–44.6)	0.45 (0.35–1.4)	0.7 (0.63–0.7)	Estrogen
Estetrol	E4; 15α,16α-Di-OH-17β-E2	4.0	3.0	4.9	19	Estrogen
Alfatradiol	17α-Estradiol	20.5 (7–80.1)	8.195 (2–42)	0.2–0.52	0.43–1.2	Metabolite
16-Epiestriol	16β-Hydroxy-17β-estradiol	7.795 (4.94–63)	50	?	?	Metabolite
17-Epiestriol	16α-Hydroxy-17α-estradiol	55.45 (29–103)	79–80	?	?	Metabolite
16,17-Epiestriol	16β-Hydroxy-17α-estradiol	1.0	13	?	?	Metabolite
2-Hydroxyestradiol	2-OH-E2	22 (7–81)	11–35	2.5	1.3	Metabolite
2-Methoxyestradiol	2-MeO-E2	0.0027–2.0	1.0	?	?	Metabolite
4-Hydroxyestradiol	4-OH-E2	13 (8–70)	7–56	1.0	1.9	Metabolite
4-Methoxyestradiol	4-MeO-E2	2.0	1.0	?	?	Metabolite
2-Hydroxyestrone	2-OH-E1	2.0–4.0	0.2–0.4	?	?	Metabolite
2-Methoxyestrone	2-MeO-E1	<0.001–<1	<1	?	?	Metabolite
4-Hydroxyestrone	4-OH-E1	1.0–2.0	1.0	?	?	Metabolite
4-Methoxyestrone	4-MeO-E1	<1	<1	?	?	Metabolite
16α-Hydroxyestrone	16α-OH-E1; 17-Ketoestriol	2.0–6.5	35	?	?	Metabolite
2-Hydroxyestriol	2-OH-E3	2.0	1.0	?	?	Metabolite
4-Methoxyestriol	4-MeO-E3	1.0	1.0	?	?	Metabolite
Estradiol sulfate	E2S; Estradiol 3-sulfate	<1	<1	?	?	Metabolite
Estradiol disulfate	Estradiol 3,17β-disulfate	0.0004	?	?	?	Metabolite
Estradiol 3-glucuronide	E2-3G	0.0079	?	?	?	Metabolite
Estradiol 17β-glucuronide	E2-17G	0.0015	?	?	?	Metabolite
Estradiol 3-gluc. 17β-sulfate	E2-3G-17S	0.0001	?	?	?	Metabolite
Estrone sulfate	E1S; Estrone 3-sulfate	<1	<1	>10	>10	Metabolite
Estradiol benzoate	EB; Estradiol 3-benzoate	10	?	?	?	Estrogen
Estradiol 17β-benzoate	E2-17B	11.3	32.6	?	?	Estrogen
Estrone methyl ether	Estrone 3-methyl ether	0.145	?	?	?	Estrogen
ent-Estradiol	1-Estradiol	1.31–12.34	9.44–80.07	?	?	Estrogen
Equilin	7-Dehydroestrone	13 (4.0–28.9)	13.0–49	0.79	0.36	Estrogen
Equilenin	6,8-Didehydroestrone	2.0–15	7.0–20	0.64	0.62	Estrogen
17β-Dihydroequilin	7-Dehydro-17β-estradiol	7.9–113	7.9–108	0.09	0.17	Estrogen
17α-Dihydroequilin	7-Dehydro-17α-estradiol	18.6 (18–41)	14–32	0.24	0.57	Estrogen
17β-Dihydroequilenin	6,8-Didehydro-17β-estradiol	35–68	90–100	0.15	0.20	Estrogen
17α-Dihydroequilenin	6,8-Didehydro-17α-estradiol	20	49	0.50	0.37	Estrogen
Δ^{8}-Estradiol	8,9-Dehydro-17β-estradiol	68	72	0.15	0.25	Estrogen
Δ^{8}-Estrone	8,9-Dehydroestrone	19	32	0.52	0.57	Estrogen
Ethinylestradiol	EE; 17α-Ethynyl-17β-E2	120.9 (68.8–480)	44.4 (2.0–144)	0.02–0.05	0.29–0.81	Estrogen
Mestranol	EE 3-methyl ether	?	2.5	?	?	Estrogen
Moxestrol	RU-2858; 11β-Methoxy-EE	35–43	5–20	0.5	2.6	Estrogen
Methylestradiol	17α-Methyl-17β-estradiol	70	44	?	?	Estrogen
Diethylstilbestrol	DES; Stilbestrol	129.5 (89.1–468)	219.63 (61.2–295)	0.04	0.05	Estrogen
Hexestrol	Dihydrodiethylstilbestrol	153.6 (31–302)	60–234	0.06	0.06	Estrogen
Dienestrol	Dehydrostilbestrol	37 (20.4–223)	56–404	0.05	0.03	Estrogen
Benzestrol (B2)	–	114	?	?	?	Estrogen
Chlorotrianisene	TACE	1.74	?	15.30	?	Estrogen
Triphenylethylene	TPE	0.074	?	?	?	Estrogen
Triphenylbromoethylene	TPBE	2.69	?	?	?	Estrogen
Tamoxifen	ICI-46,474	3 (0.1–47)	3.33 (0.28–6)	3.4–9.69	2.5	SERM
Afimoxifene	4-Hydroxytamoxifen; 4-OHT	100.1 (1.7–257)	10 (0.98–339)	2.3 (0.1–3.61)	0.04–4.8	SERM
Toremifene	4-Chlorotamoxifen; 4-CT	?	?	7.14–20.3	15.4	SERM
Clomifene	MRL-41	25 (19.2–37.2)	12	0.9	1.2	SERM
Cyclofenil	F-6066; Sexovid	151–152	243	?	?	SERM
Nafoxidine	U-11,000A	30.9–44	16	0.3	0.8	SERM
Raloxifene	–	41.2 (7.8–69)	5.34 (0.54–16)	0.188–0.52	20.2	SERM
Arzoxifene	LY-353,381	?	?	0.179	?	SERM
Lasofoxifene	CP-336,156	10.2–166	19.0	0.229	?	SERM
Ormeloxifene	Centchroman	?	?	0.313	?	SERM
Levormeloxifene	6720-CDRI; NNC-460,020	1.55	1.88	?	?	SERM
Ospemifene	Deaminohydroxytoremifene	0.82–2.63	0.59–1.22	?	?	SERM
Bazedoxifene	–	?	?	0.053	?	SERM
Etacstil	GW-5638	4.30	11.5	?	?	SERM
ICI-164,384	–	63.5 (3.70–97.7)	166	0.2	0.08	Antiestrogen
Fulvestrant	ICI-182,780	43.5 (9.4–325)	21.65 (2.05–40.5)	0.42	1.3	Antiestrogen
Propylpyrazoletriol	PPT	49 (10.0–89.1)	0.12	0.40	92.8	ERα agonist
16α-LE2	16α-Lactone-17β-estradiol	14.6–57	0.089	0.27	131	ERα agonist
16α-Iodo-E2	16α-Iodo-17β-estradiol	30.2	2.30	?	?	ERα agonist
Methylpiperidinopyrazole	MPP	11	0.05	?	?	ERα antagonist
Diarylpropionitrile	DPN	0.12–0.25	6.6–18	32.4	1.7	ERβ agonist
8β-VE2	8β-Vinyl-17β-estradiol	0.35	22.0–83	12.9	0.50	ERβ agonist
Prinaberel	ERB-041; WAY-202,041	0.27	67–72	?	?	ERβ agonist
ERB-196	WAY-202,196	?	180	?	?	ERβ agonist
Erteberel	SERBA-1; LY-500,307	?	?	2.68	0.19	ERβ agonist
SERBA-2	–	?	?	14.5	1.54	ERβ agonist
Coumestrol	–	9.225 (0.0117–94)	64.125 (0.41–185)	0.14–80.0	0.07–27.0	Xenoestrogen
Genistein	–	0.445 (0.0012–16)	33.42 (0.86–87)	2.6–126	0.3–12.8	Xenoestrogen
Equol	–	0.2–0.287	0.85 (0.10–2.85)	?	?	Xenoestrogen
Daidzein	–	0.07 (0.0018–9.3)	0.7865 (0.04–17.1)	2.0	85.3	Xenoestrogen
Biochanin A	–	0.04 (0.022–0.15)	0.6225 (0.010–1.2)	174	8.9	Xenoestrogen
Kaempferol	–	0.07 (0.029–0.10)	2.2 (0.002–3.00)	?	?	Xenoestrogen
Naringenin	–	0.0054 (<0.001–0.01)	0.15 (0.11–0.33)	?	?	Xenoestrogen
8-Prenylnaringenin	8-PN	4.4	?	?	?	Xenoestrogen
Quercetin	–	<0.001–0.01	0.002–0.040	?	?	Xenoestrogen
Ipriflavone	–	<0.01	<0.01	?	?	Xenoestrogen
Miroestrol	–	0.39	?	?	?	Xenoestrogen
Deoxymiroestrol	–	2.0	?	?	?	Xenoestrogen
β-Sitosterol	–	<0.001–0.0875	<0.001–0.016	?	?	Xenoestrogen
Resveratrol	–	<0.001–0.0032	?	?	?	Xenoestrogen
α-Zearalenol	–	48 (13–52.5)	?	?	?	Xenoestrogen
β-Zearalenol	–	0.6 (0.032–13)	?	?	?	Xenoestrogen
Zeranol	α-Zearalanol	48–111	?	?	?	Xenoestrogen
Taleranol	β-Zearalanol	16 (13–17.8)	14	0.8	0.9	Xenoestrogen
Zearalenone	ZEN	7.68 (2.04–28)	9.45 (2.43–31.5)	?	?	Xenoestrogen
Zearalanone	ZAN	0.51	?	?	?	Xenoestrogen
Bisphenol A	BPA	0.0315 (0.008–1.0)	0.135 (0.002–4.23)	195	35	Xenoestrogen
Endosulfan	EDS	<0.001–<0.01	<0.01	?	?	Xenoestrogen
Kepone	Chlordecone	0.0069–0.2	?	?	?	Xenoestrogen
o,p'-DDT	–	0.0073–0.4	?	?	?	Xenoestrogen
p,p'-DDT	–	0.03	?	?	?	Xenoestrogen
Methoxychlor	p,p'-Dimethoxy-DDT	0.01 (<0.001–0.02)	0.01–0.13	?	?	Xenoestrogen
HPTE	Hydroxychlor; p,p'-OH-DDT	1.2–1.7	?	?	?	Xenoestrogen
Testosterone	T; 4-Androstenolone	<0.0001–<0.01	<0.002–0.040	>5000	>5000	Androgen
Dihydrotestosterone	DHT; 5α-Androstanolone	0.01 (<0.001–0.05)	0.0059–0.17	221–>5000	73–1688	Androgen
Nandrolone	19-Nortestosterone; 19-NT	0.01	0.23	765	53	Androgen
Dehydroepiandrosterone	DHEA; Prasterone	0.038 (<0.001–0.04)	0.019–0.07	245–1053	163–515	Androgen
5-Androstenediol	A5; Androstenediol	6	17	3.6	0.9	Androgen
4-Androstenediol	–	0.5	0.6	23	19	Androgen
4-Androstenedione	A4; Androstenedione	<0.01	<0.01	>10000	>10000	Androgen
3α-Androstanediol	3α-Adiol	0.07	0.3	260	48	Androgen
3β-Androstanediol	3β-Adiol	3	7	6	2	Androgen
Androstanedione	5α-Androstanedione	<0.01	<0.01	>10000	>10000	Androgen
Etiocholanedione	5β-Androstanedione	<0.01	<0.01	>10000	>10000	Androgen
Methyltestosterone	17α-Methyltestosterone	<0.0001	?	?	?	Androgen
Ethinyl-3α-androstanediol	17α-Ethynyl-3α-adiol	4.0	<0.07	?	?	Estrogen
Ethinyl-3β-androstanediol	17α-Ethynyl-3β-adiol	50	5.6	?	?	Estrogen
Progesterone	P4; 4-Pregnenedione	<0.001–0.6	<0.001–0.010	?	?	Progestogen
Norethisterone	NET; 17α-Ethynyl-19-NT	0.085 (0.0015–<0.1)	0.1 (0.01–0.3)	152	1084	Progestogen
Norethynodrel	5(10)-Norethisterone	0.5 (0.3–0.7)	<0.1–0.22	14	53	Progestogen
Tibolone	7α-Methylnorethynodrel	0.5 (0.45–2.0)	0.2–0.076	?	?	Progestogen
Δ^{4}-Tibolone	7α-Methylnorethisterone	0.069–<0.1	0.027–<0.1	?	?	Progestogen
3α-Hydroxytibolone	–	2.5 (1.06–5.0)	0.6–0.8	?	?	Progestogen
3β-Hydroxytibolone	–	1.6 (0.75–1.9)	0.070–0.1	?	?	Progestogen
Footnotes: ^{a} = (1) Binding affinity values are of the format "median (range)" (# (#–#)), "range" (#–#), or "value" (#) depending on the values available. The full sets of values within the ranges can be found in the Wiki code. (2) Binding affinities were determined via displacement studies in a variety of in-vitro systems with labeled estradiol and human ERα and ERβ proteins (except the ERβ values from Kuiper et al. (1997), which are rat ERβ). Sources: See template page.

== Analogues ==
Analogues of 17α-ethynyl-3β-androstanediol include 17α-ethynyl-3α-androstanediol, ethinylandrostenediol (17α-ethynyl-5-androstenediol), ethandrostate (17α-ethynyl-5-androstenediol 3β-cyclohexanepropionate), ethinylestradiol (17α-ethynylestradiol), ethisterone (17α-ethynyltestosterone), and 5α-dihydroethisterone (17α-ethynyldihydrotestosterone).
