= Androstenediol =

Chemical compound

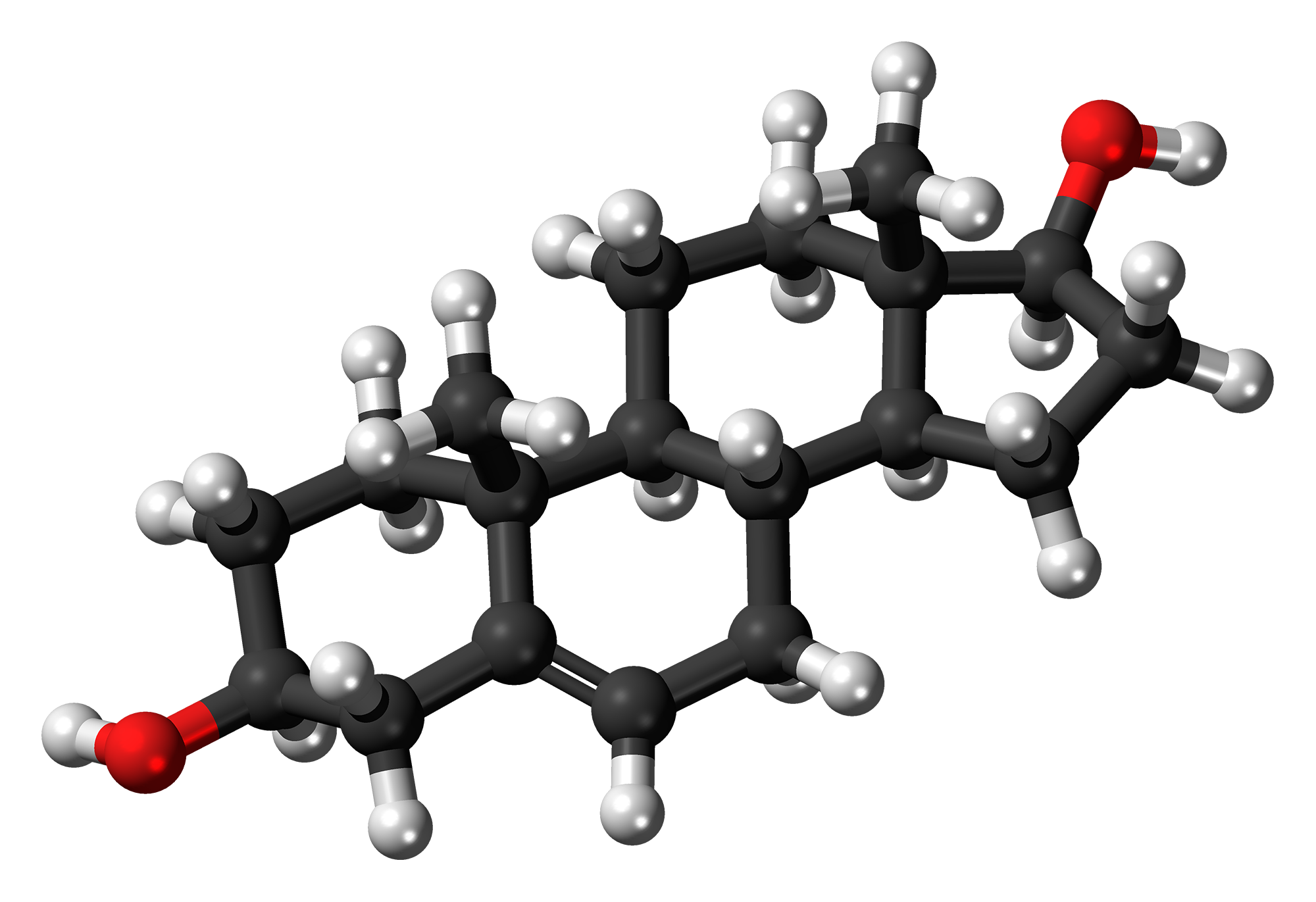

Clinical data
- Other names: A5; Δ^{5}-Diol; Androstenediol; Androst-5-ene-3β,17β-diol; Hermaphrodiol; HE2100
- Routes of administration: By mouth
- Drug class: Androgen; Anabolic steroid

Identifiers
- IUPAC name: (3S,8R,9S,10R,13S,14S,17S)-10,13-dimethyl-2,3,4,7,8,9,11,12,14,15,16,17-dodecahydro-1H-cyclopenta[a]phenanthrene-3,17-diol
- CAS Number: 521-17-5
- PubChem CID: 10634
- DrugBank: DB01524
- ChemSpider: 10188
- UNII: 95PS51EMXY
- KEGG: C04295
- ChEBI: CHEBI:2710
- ChEMBL: ChEMBL440283
- CompTox Dashboard (EPA): DTXSID9022609
- ECHA InfoCard: 100.007.553

Chemical and physical data
- Formula: C_{19}H_{30}O_{2}
- Molar mass: 290.447 g·mol^{−1}
- 3D model (JSmol): Interactive image
- SMILES: O[C@@H]4C/C3=C/C[C@@H]1[C@H](CC[C@@]2([C@@H](O)CC[C@@H]12)C)[C@@]3(C)CC4
- InChI: InChI=1S/C19H30O2/c1-18-9-7-13(20)11-12(18)3-4-14-15-5-6-17(21)19(15,2)10-8-16(14)18/h3,13-17,20-21H,4-11H2,1-2H3/t13-,14-,15-,16-,17-,18-,19-/m0/s1; Key:QADHLRWLCPCEKT-LOVVWNRFSA-N

Androstenediol, or 5-androstenediol (abbreviated as A5 or Δ^{5}-diol), also known as androst-5-ene-3β,17β-diol, is an endogenous weak androgen and estrogen steroid hormone and intermediate in the biosynthesis of testosterone from dehydroepiandrosterone (DHEA). It is closely related to androstenedione (androst-4-ene-3,17-dione).

== Biological activity ==
Androstenediol is a direct metabolite of the most abundant steroid produced by the human adrenal cortex, DHEA. It is less androgenic than the related compound, Δ^{4}-androstenediol, and has been found to stimulate the immune system. When administered to rats, androstenediol, in vivo, has approximately 1.4% of the androgenicity of DHEA, 0.54% of the androgenicity of androstenedione, and 0.21% of the androgenicity of testosterone.

Androstenediol possesses potent estrogenic activity, similarly to DHEA and 3β-androstanediol. It has approximately 6% and 17% of the affinity of estradiol at the ERα and ERβ, respectively. Although androstenediol has far lower affinity for the ERs compared to the major estrogen estradiol, it circulates at approximately 100-fold higher concentrations, and so is thought may play a significant role as an estrogen in the body.

Affinities of estrogen receptor ligands for the ERα and ERβ
Ligand	Other names	Relative binding affinities (RBA, %)^{a}		Absolute binding affinities (K_{i}, nM)^{a}		Action
Ligand	Other names	ERα	ERβ	ERα	ERβ	Action
Estradiol	E2; 17β-Estradiol	100	100	0.115 (0.04–0.24)	0.15 (0.10–2.08)	Estrogen
Estrone	E1; 17-Ketoestradiol	16.39 (0.7–60)	6.5 (1.36–52)	0.445 (0.3–1.01)	1.75 (0.35–9.24)	Estrogen
Estriol	E3; 16α-OH-17β-E2	12.65 (4.03–56)	26 (14.0–44.6)	0.45 (0.35–1.4)	0.7 (0.63–0.7)	Estrogen
Estetrol	E4; 15α,16α-Di-OH-17β-E2	4.0	3.0	4.9	19	Estrogen
Alfatradiol	17α-Estradiol	20.5 (7–80.1)	8.195 (2–42)	0.2–0.52	0.43–1.2	Metabolite
16-Epiestriol	16β-Hydroxy-17β-estradiol	7.795 (4.94–63)	50	?	?	Metabolite
17-Epiestriol	16α-Hydroxy-17α-estradiol	55.45 (29–103)	79–80	?	?	Metabolite
16,17-Epiestriol	16β-Hydroxy-17α-estradiol	1.0	13	?	?	Metabolite
2-Hydroxyestradiol	2-OH-E2	22 (7–81)	11–35	2.5	1.3	Metabolite
2-Methoxyestradiol	2-MeO-E2	0.0027–2.0	1.0	?	?	Metabolite
4-Hydroxyestradiol	4-OH-E2	13 (8–70)	7–56	1.0	1.9	Metabolite
4-Methoxyestradiol	4-MeO-E2	2.0	1.0	?	?	Metabolite
2-Hydroxyestrone	2-OH-E1	2.0–4.0	0.2–0.4	?	?	Metabolite
2-Methoxyestrone	2-MeO-E1	<0.001–<1	<1	?	?	Metabolite
4-Hydroxyestrone	4-OH-E1	1.0–2.0	1.0	?	?	Metabolite
4-Methoxyestrone	4-MeO-E1	<1	<1	?	?	Metabolite
16α-Hydroxyestrone	16α-OH-E1; 17-Ketoestriol	2.0–6.5	35	?	?	Metabolite
2-Hydroxyestriol	2-OH-E3	2.0	1.0	?	?	Metabolite
4-Methoxyestriol	4-MeO-E3	1.0	1.0	?	?	Metabolite
Estradiol sulfate	E2S; Estradiol 3-sulfate	<1	<1	?	?	Metabolite
Estradiol disulfate	Estradiol 3,17β-disulfate	0.0004	?	?	?	Metabolite
Estradiol 3-glucuronide	E2-3G	0.0079	?	?	?	Metabolite
Estradiol 17β-glucuronide	E2-17G	0.0015	?	?	?	Metabolite
Estradiol 3-gluc. 17β-sulfate	E2-3G-17S	0.0001	?	?	?	Metabolite
Estrone sulfate	E1S; Estrone 3-sulfate	<1	<1	>10	>10	Metabolite
Estradiol benzoate	EB; Estradiol 3-benzoate	10	?	?	?	Estrogen
Estradiol 17β-benzoate	E2-17B	11.3	32.6	?	?	Estrogen
Estrone methyl ether	Estrone 3-methyl ether	0.145	?	?	?	Estrogen
ent-Estradiol	1-Estradiol	1.31–12.34	9.44–80.07	?	?	Estrogen
Equilin	7-Dehydroestrone	13 (4.0–28.9)	13.0–49	0.79	0.36	Estrogen
Equilenin	6,8-Didehydroestrone	2.0–15	7.0–20	0.64	0.62	Estrogen
17β-Dihydroequilin	7-Dehydro-17β-estradiol	7.9–113	7.9–108	0.09	0.17	Estrogen
17α-Dihydroequilin	7-Dehydro-17α-estradiol	18.6 (18–41)	14–32	0.24	0.57	Estrogen
17β-Dihydroequilenin	6,8-Didehydro-17β-estradiol	35–68	90–100	0.15	0.20	Estrogen
17α-Dihydroequilenin	6,8-Didehydro-17α-estradiol	20	49	0.50	0.37	Estrogen
Δ^{8}-Estradiol	8,9-Dehydro-17β-estradiol	68	72	0.15	0.25	Estrogen
Δ^{8}-Estrone	8,9-Dehydroestrone	19	32	0.52	0.57	Estrogen
Ethinylestradiol	EE; 17α-Ethynyl-17β-E2	120.9 (68.8–480)	44.4 (2.0–144)	0.02–0.05	0.29–0.81	Estrogen
Mestranol	EE 3-methyl ether	?	2.5	?	?	Estrogen
Moxestrol	RU-2858; 11β-Methoxy-EE	35–43	5–20	0.5	2.6	Estrogen
Methylestradiol	17α-Methyl-17β-estradiol	70	44	?	?	Estrogen
Diethylstilbestrol	DES; Stilbestrol	129.5 (89.1–468)	219.63 (61.2–295)	0.04	0.05	Estrogen
Hexestrol	Dihydrodiethylstilbestrol	153.6 (31–302)	60–234	0.06	0.06	Estrogen
Dienestrol	Dehydrostilbestrol	37 (20.4–223)	56–404	0.05	0.03	Estrogen
Benzestrol (B2)	–	114	?	?	?	Estrogen
Chlorotrianisene	TACE	1.74	?	15.30	?	Estrogen
Triphenylethylene	TPE	0.074	?	?	?	Estrogen
Triphenylbromoethylene	TPBE	2.69	?	?	?	Estrogen
Tamoxifen	ICI-46,474	3 (0.1–47)	3.33 (0.28–6)	3.4–9.69	2.5	SERM
Afimoxifene	4-Hydroxytamoxifen; 4-OHT	100.1 (1.7–257)	10 (0.98–339)	2.3 (0.1–3.61)	0.04–4.8	SERM
Toremifene	4-Chlorotamoxifen; 4-CT	?	?	7.14–20.3	15.4	SERM
Clomifene	MRL-41	25 (19.2–37.2)	12	0.9	1.2	SERM
Cyclofenil	F-6066; Sexovid	151–152	243	?	?	SERM
Nafoxidine	U-11,000A	30.9–44	16	0.3	0.8	SERM
Raloxifene	–	41.2 (7.8–69)	5.34 (0.54–16)	0.188–0.52	20.2	SERM
Arzoxifene	LY-353,381	?	?	0.179	?	SERM
Lasofoxifene	CP-336,156	10.2–166	19.0	0.229	?	SERM
Ormeloxifene	Centchroman	?	?	0.313	?	SERM
Levormeloxifene	6720-CDRI; NNC-460,020	1.55	1.88	?	?	SERM
Ospemifene	Deaminohydroxytoremifene	0.82–2.63	0.59–1.22	?	?	SERM
Bazedoxifene	–	?	?	0.053	?	SERM
Etacstil	GW-5638	4.30	11.5	?	?	SERM
ICI-164,384	–	63.5 (3.70–97.7)	166	0.2	0.08	Antiestrogen
Fulvestrant	ICI-182,780	43.5 (9.4–325)	21.65 (2.05–40.5)	0.42	1.3	Antiestrogen
Propylpyrazoletriol	PPT	49 (10.0–89.1)	0.12	0.40	92.8	ERα agonist
16α-LE2	16α-Lactone-17β-estradiol	14.6–57	0.089	0.27	131	ERα agonist
16α-Iodo-E2	16α-Iodo-17β-estradiol	30.2	2.30	?	?	ERα agonist
Methylpiperidinopyrazole	MPP	11	0.05	?	?	ERα antagonist
Diarylpropionitrile	DPN	0.12–0.25	6.6–18	32.4	1.7	ERβ agonist
8β-VE2	8β-Vinyl-17β-estradiol	0.35	22.0–83	12.9	0.50	ERβ agonist
Prinaberel	ERB-041; WAY-202,041	0.27	67–72	?	?	ERβ agonist
ERB-196	WAY-202,196	?	180	?	?	ERβ agonist
Erteberel	SERBA-1; LY-500,307	?	?	2.68	0.19	ERβ agonist
SERBA-2	–	?	?	14.5	1.54	ERβ agonist
Coumestrol	–	9.225 (0.0117–94)	64.125 (0.41–185)	0.14–80.0	0.07–27.0	Xenoestrogen
Genistein	–	0.445 (0.0012–16)	33.42 (0.86–87)	2.6–126	0.3–12.8	Xenoestrogen
Equol	–	0.2–0.287	0.85 (0.10–2.85)	?	?	Xenoestrogen
Daidzein	–	0.07 (0.0018–9.3)	0.7865 (0.04–17.1)	2.0	85.3	Xenoestrogen
Biochanin A	–	0.04 (0.022–0.15)	0.6225 (0.010–1.2)	174	8.9	Xenoestrogen
Kaempferol	–	0.07 (0.029–0.10)	2.2 (0.002–3.00)	?	?	Xenoestrogen
Naringenin	–	0.0054 (<0.001–0.01)	0.15 (0.11–0.33)	?	?	Xenoestrogen
8-Prenylnaringenin	8-PN	4.4	?	?	?	Xenoestrogen
Quercetin	–	<0.001–0.01	0.002–0.040	?	?	Xenoestrogen
Ipriflavone	–	<0.01	<0.01	?	?	Xenoestrogen
Miroestrol	–	0.39	?	?	?	Xenoestrogen
Deoxymiroestrol	–	2.0	?	?	?	Xenoestrogen
β-Sitosterol	–	<0.001–0.0875	<0.001–0.016	?	?	Xenoestrogen
Resveratrol	–	<0.001–0.0032	?	?	?	Xenoestrogen
α-Zearalenol	–	48 (13–52.5)	?	?	?	Xenoestrogen
β-Zearalenol	–	0.6 (0.032–13)	?	?	?	Xenoestrogen
Zeranol	α-Zearalanol	48–111	?	?	?	Xenoestrogen
Taleranol	β-Zearalanol	16 (13–17.8)	14	0.8	0.9	Xenoestrogen
Zearalenone	ZEN	7.68 (2.04–28)	9.45 (2.43–31.5)	?	?	Xenoestrogen
Zearalanone	ZAN	0.51	?	?	?	Xenoestrogen
Bisphenol A	BPA	0.0315 (0.008–1.0)	0.135 (0.002–4.23)	195	35	Xenoestrogen
Endosulfan	EDS	<0.001–<0.01	<0.01	?	?	Xenoestrogen
Kepone	Chlordecone	0.0069–0.2	?	?	?	Xenoestrogen
o,p'-DDT	–	0.0073–0.4	?	?	?	Xenoestrogen
p,p'-DDT	–	0.03	?	?	?	Xenoestrogen
Methoxychlor	p,p'-Dimethoxy-DDT	0.01 (<0.001–0.02)	0.01–0.13	?	?	Xenoestrogen
HPTE	Hydroxychlor; p,p'-OH-DDT	1.2–1.7	?	?	?	Xenoestrogen
Testosterone	T; 4-Androstenolone	<0.0001–<0.01	<0.002–0.040	>5000	>5000	Androgen
Dihydrotestosterone	DHT; 5α-Androstanolone	0.01 (<0.001–0.05)	0.0059–0.17	221–>5000	73–1688	Androgen
Nandrolone	19-Nortestosterone; 19-NT	0.01	0.23	765	53	Androgen
Dehydroepiandrosterone	DHEA; Prasterone	0.038 (<0.001–0.04)	0.019–0.07	245–1053	163–515	Androgen
5-Androstenediol	A5; Androstenediol	6	17	3.6	0.9	Androgen
4-Androstenediol	–	0.5	0.6	23	19	Androgen
4-Androstenedione	A4; Androstenedione	<0.01	<0.01	>10000	>10000	Androgen
3α-Androstanediol	3α-Adiol	0.07	0.3	260	48	Androgen
3β-Androstanediol	3β-Adiol	3	7	6	2	Androgen
Androstanedione	5α-Androstanedione	<0.01	<0.01	>10000	>10000	Androgen
Etiocholanedione	5β-Androstanedione	<0.01	<0.01	>10000	>10000	Androgen
Methyltestosterone	17α-Methyltestosterone	<0.0001	?	?	?	Androgen
Ethinyl-3α-androstanediol	17α-Ethynyl-3α-adiol	4.0	<0.07	?	?	Estrogen
Ethinyl-3β-androstanediol	17α-Ethynyl-3β-adiol	50	5.6	?	?	Estrogen
Progesterone	P4; 4-Pregnenedione	<0.001–0.6	<0.001–0.010	?	?	Progestogen
Norethisterone	NET; 17α-Ethynyl-19-NT	0.085 (0.0015–<0.1)	0.1 (0.01–0.3)	152	1084	Progestogen
Norethynodrel	5(10)-Norethisterone	0.5 (0.3–0.7)	<0.1–0.22	14	53	Progestogen
Tibolone	7α-Methylnorethynodrel	0.5 (0.45–2.0)	0.2–0.076	?	?	Progestogen
Δ^{4}-Tibolone	7α-Methylnorethisterone	0.069–<0.1	0.027–<0.1	?	?	Progestogen
3α-Hydroxytibolone	–	2.5 (1.06–5.0)	0.6–0.8	?	?	Progestogen
3β-Hydroxytibolone	–	1.6 (0.75–1.9)	0.070–0.1	?	?	Progestogen
Footnotes: ^{a} = (1) Binding affinity values are of the format "median (range)" (# (#–#)), "range" (#–#), or "value" (#) depending on the values available. The full sets of values within the ranges can be found in the Wiki code. (2) Binding affinities were determined via displacement studies in a variety of in-vitro systems with labeled estradiol and human ERα and ERβ proteins (except the ERβ values from Kuiper et al. (1997), which are rat ERβ). Sources: See template page.

== Chemistry ==
Androstenediol, also known as androst-5-ene-3β,17β-diol, is a naturally occurring androstane steroid. It is closely related structurally to androstenedione (A4; androst-4-ene-3,17-dione), dehydroepiandrosterone (DHEA; androst-5-en-3β-ol-17-one), and testosterone (androst-4-en-17β-ol-3-one), as well as to 3β-androstanediol (5α-androstane-3β,17β-diol).

Derivatives and analogues of androstenediol, such as the 17α-substituted methandriol (17α-methylandrostenediol) and ethinylandrostenediol (17α-ethynylandrostenediol) as well as the naturally occurring 19-norandrostane derivative norandostenediol (19-nor-5-androstenediol), have been synthesized and studied. Methandriol and its esters are androgens and anabolic steroids while ethinylandrostenediol is an estrogen.

=== Synthesis ===
The chemical synthesis entails the reduction of the 17-keto group of DHEA:

=== Esters ===
A number of esters of Androstenediol have been prepared:

- 3-Ac: [1639-43-6]
- 17-Ac: [5937-72-4]
- Di-Ac: [2099-26-5]
- Androstenediol dipropionate [2297-30-5]. Bisexovis, Bisexovister, Ginandrin, Stenandiol.

== Research ==
=== Radiation countermeasure ===
Androstenediol has been investigated for use as a radiation countermeasure. Its value as a radiation countermeasure is based mainly on its stimulation of production of white blood cells and platelets. Its potential use as a radiation countermeasure was developed by the Armed Forces Radiobiology Research Institute (AFRRI) and subsequently studied by AFRRI and Hollis-Eden Pharmaceuticals under the proposed brand name Neumune for the treatment of acute radiation syndrome.

The clinical trials with rhesus monkeys were successful. According to the Hollis-Eden report, only 12.5% of the 40 Neumune-treated animals died versus 32.5% in the placebo group.

Hollis-Eden had applied for a contract from the U.S. Government under the BioShield Request for Proposals (RFP) for radiation countermeasures. After being encouraged for 2.5 years that Neumune was in the competitive range, on March 9, 2007, the RFP was canceled by HHS. According to HHS, "the product was no longer in the competitive range". No further explanation was given. As a result, Hollis-Eden has now withdrawn from the radiation countermeasure field.

== Additional images ==
Steroidogenesis, with androstenediol at bottom left.
