= Epiestriol (set index) =

Epiestriol may refer to:

- 16β-Epiestriol (16β-hydroxy-17β-estradiol)
- 17α-Epiestriol (16α-hydroxy-17α-estradiol)
- 16β,17α-Epiestriol (16β-hydroxy-17α-estradiol)
