= List of estrogens =

Estradiol, the prototypical estrogen.

Steroid ring system.

This is a list of steroidal estrogens or derivatives of estradiol, estrone, and estriol. Most esters of these estrogens are not included in this list; for esters, see here instead.

== Estradiol derivatives ==
Compound	Chemical name	Structure	Marketed
Estradiol (E2)	Estra-1,3,5(10)-triene-3,17β-diol		✓
2-Hydroxyestradiol	2-Hydroxyestradiol		–
4-Hydroxyestradiol	4-Hydroxyestradiol		–
4-Methoxyestradiol	4-Methoxyestradiol		–
8β-VE_{2}	8β-Vinylestradiol		–
16α-IE_{2}	16α-Iodoestradiol		–
16α-LE_{2}	Estradiol 21,16α-lactone^{?}		–
Cloxestradiol	Estradiol 17β-chloral hemiacetal ether		–
Cloxestradiol acetate	Estradiol 17β-chloral hemiacetal ether O,O-diacetate		✓
Estradiol sulfate	Estradiol 3-sulfate		–
Estrapronicate	Estradiol 3-propionate 17β-nicotinate		✓
Orestrate	Estradiol 3-propionate 17β-(1-cyclohexenyl) ether		–
Polyestradiol phosphate	Estradiol 17β-phosphate polymer		✓
Promestriene	Estradiol 3-propyl 17β-methyl diether		✓

=== 17α-Substituted estradiol derivatives ===
Compound	Chemical name	Structure	Marketed
Cyclodiol	14α,17α-Ethanoestradiol		–
Estrazinol	8-Aza-17α-ethynylestradiol 3-methyl ether		–
Estrofurate	17α-(3-Furyl)-δ^{7}-estradiol 3-acetate		–
Etamestrol (eptamestrol)	1-Hydroxy-7α-methyl-17α-ethynylestradiol 1,3-dibenzoate		–
Ethinylestradiol (EE)	17α-Ethynylestradiol		✓
Ethinylestradiol sulfonate (EES)	17α-Ethynylestradiol 3-isopropylsulfonate		✓
Ethylestradiol	17α-Ethylestradiol		–
Mestranol (EE3ME)	17α-Ethynylestradiol 3-methyl ether		✓
Methylestradiol	17α-Methylestradiol		✓
Moxestrol	11β-Methoxy-17α-ethynylestradiol		✓
Quinestrol	17α-Ethynylestradiol 3-cyclopentyl ether		✓
RU-16117	11α-Methoxy-17α-ethynylestradiol		–

=== Nitrogen mustard-coupled alkylating antineoplastic estradiol derivatives ===
Compound	Chemical name	Structure	Marketed
Alestramustine	Estradiol 3-(bis(2-chloroethyl)carbamate) 17β-(2β-aminopropanoate)		–
Atrimustine	Estradiol 3-benzoate 17β-(4-(4-(bis(2-chloroethyl)amino)phenyl)-1-oxobutoxy)acetate		–
Estramustine	Estradiol 3-(bis(2-chloroethyl)carbamate)		–
Estramustine phosphate	Estradiol 3-(bis(2-chloroethyl)carbamate) 17β-phosphate		✓

=== 17β-Aminoestrogens ===
Compound	Chemical name	Structure	Marketed
Aminoestradiol	17β-Aminoestradiol		–
Butolame	17β-((4-Hydroxybutyl)amino)estradiol		–
Hexolame	17β-((6-Hydroxyhexyl)amino)estradiol		–
Pentolame	17β-((5-Hydroxypentyl)amino)estradiol		–
Prodiame	17β-((3-Aminopropyl)amino)estradiol		–
Prolame	17β-((3-Hydroxypropyl)amino)estradiol		–

== Estrone derivatives ==
Compound	Chemical name	Structure	Marketed
Estrone (E1)	Estra-1,3,5(10)-triene-3-ol-17-one		✓
2-Hydroxyestrone	2-Hydroxyestrone		–
4-Hydroxyestrone	4-Hydroxyestrone		–
4-Methoxyestrone	4-Methoxyestrone		–
16α-Hydroxyestrone	16α-Hydroxyestrone		–
Almestrone	7α-Methylestrone		✓
Clomestrone	16α-Chloroestrone 3-methyl ether		✓
Estrone sulfate	Estrone 3-sulfate		✓
Estropipate	Estrone 3-sulfate piperazine salt		✓
Hydroxyestrone diacetate	16α-Hydroxyestrone 3,16α-diacetate		✓

=== Nitrogen mustard-coupled alkylating antineoplastic estrone derivatives ===
Compound	Chemical name	Structure	Marketed
Estromustine	Estrone 3-(bis(2-chloroethyl)carbamate)		–

== Estriol derivatives ==
Compound	Chemical name	Structure	Marketed
Estriol (E3)	16α-Hydroxyestradiol		✓
Estetrol (E4)	15α-Hydroxyestriol		–
Quinestradol	Estriol 3-cyclopentyl ether		✓

=== 17α-Substituted estriol derivatives ===
Compound	Chemical name	Structure	Marketed
Cyclotriol	14α,17α-Ethanoestriol		–
Ethinylestriol	17α-Ethynylestriol		–
Nilestriol	17α-Ethynylestriol 3-cyclopentyl ether		✓

== Other estrogen derivatives ==
=== Epimers ===
Compound	Chemical name	Structure	Marketed
17α-Estradiol (alfatradiol)	17α-Estradiol		✓
16β-Epiestriol (epiestriol)	16β-Hydroxy-17β-estradiol		✓
17α-Epiestriol	16α-Hydroxy-17α-estradiol		–
16β,17α-Epiestriol	16β-Hydroxy-17α-estradiol		–
Epimestrol	17α-Epiestriol 3-methyl ether		✓
Mytatrienediol	16α-Methyl-16β-epiestriol 3-methyl ether		–

=== Equine estrogens ===
Compound	Chemical name	Structure	Marketed
Equilin	Δ^{7}-Estrone		✓
Equilenin	Δ^{6,8}-Estrone		✓
17α-Dihydroequilin	Δ^{7}-17α-Estradiol		✓
17β-Dihydroequilin	Δ^{7}-17β-Estradiol		✓
17α-Dihydroequilenin	Δ^{6,8}-17α-Estradiol		✓
17β-Dihydroequilenin	Δ^{6,8}-17β-Estradiol		✓
8,9-Dehydroestrone	Δ^{8}-Estrone		✓
8,9-Dehydroestradiol	Δ^{8}-17β-Estradiol		✓
Hippulin	Δ^{8}-14-Isoestrone		✓

== See also ==
- List of steroids

== Notes ==
^{?} = Chemical names that are unverified.
