= C18H24O2 =

The molecular formula C_{18}H_{24}O_{2} may refer to:

- Alfatradiol
- Bolandione
- Dienolone
- ent-Estradiol
- Estradiol
- 17α-Estradiol
- 19-Nor-5-androstenedione
