= Ell-Cranell =

Ell-Cranell is the trade name of two hair loss treatments in Germany:

- Ell-Cranell alpha (alfatradiol)
- Ell-Cranell dexa (alfatradiol and dexamethasone)
