= C18H20O2 =

The molecular formula C_{18}H_{20}O_{2} (molar mass : 268.35 g/mol) may refer to:

- Bisphenol Z
- Dianin's compound
- Dianol
- Diethylstilbestrol
- 17α-Dihydroequilenin
- 17β-Dihydroequilenin
- 8,9-Dehydroestrone
- Equilin
- Hippulin
- 4-Methyl-2,4-bis(4-hydroxyphenyl)pent-1-ene
- Trendione
