= 16-Hydroxyestradiol =

16-Hydroxyestradiol may refer to:

- Estriol (16α-hydroxyestradiol)
- Epiestriol (16β-hydroxyestradiol)
