= Hydroxyestrone diacetate =

Chemical compound

Clinical data
- Trade names: Colpoginon, Colpormon, Hormobion, Hormocervix
- Other names: RD-310; 16α-Hydroxyestrone diacetate; 3,16α-Dihydroxyestra-1,3,5(10)-trien-17-one 3,16α-diacetate
- Routes of administration: By mouth
- Drug class: Estrogen; Estrogen ester

Identifiers
- IUPAC name: [(8R,9S,13S,14S,16R)-3-acetyloxy-13-methyl-17-oxo-7,8,9,11,12,14,15,16-octahydro-6H-cyclopenta[a]phenanthren-16-yl] acetate
- CAS Number: 1247-71-8
- PubChem CID: 102046
- ChemSpider: 92184
- UNII: 2U3VOE52DG
- CompTox Dashboard (EPA): DTXSID50878610
- ECHA InfoCard: 100.013.634

Chemical and physical data
- Formula: C_{22}H_{26}O_{5}
- Molar mass: 370.445 g·mol^{−1}
- 3D model (JSmol): Interactive image
- SMILES: CC(=O)OC1CC2C3CCC4=C(C3CCC2(C1=O)C)C=CC(=C4)OC(=O)C
- InChI: InChI=1S/C22H26O5/c1-12(23)26-15-5-7-16-14(10-15)4-6-18-17(16)8-9-22(3)19(18)11-20(21(22)25)27-13(2)24/h5,7,10,17-20H,4,6,8-9,11H2,1-3H3/t17-,18-,19+,20-,22+/m1/s1; Key:QZQSENRWYLQIPC-JPVHLGFFSA-N

Hydroxyestrone diacetate (brand names Colpoginon, Colpormon, Hormobion, Hormocervix) (former developmental code name RD-310), or 16α-hydroxyestrone diacetate, also known as 3,16α-dihydroxyestra-1,3,5(10)-trien-17-one 3,16α-diacetate, is a synthetic, steroidal estrogen which has been marketed in France, Spain, Brazil, and Argentina. It is a derivative of 16α-hydroxyestrone with an acetate esters attached at the C3 and C16α positions.

== See also ==
- List of estrogens
- List of estrogen esters
