= Etamestrol =

Chemical compound

Identifiers
- IUPAC name: [(7R,8S,9S,13S,14S,17R)-1-benzoyloxy-17-ethynyl-17-hydroxy-7,13-dimethyl-7,8,9,11,12,14,15,16-octahydro-6H-cyclopenta[a]phenanthren-3-yl] benzoate
- CAS Number: 73764-72-4
- PubChem CID: 208935
- ChemSpider: 181030
- UNII: VM88TV4OS5
- ChEMBL: ChEMBL2106046
- CompTox Dashboard (EPA): DTXSID70994669

Chemical and physical data
- Formula: C_{35}H_{34}O_{5}
- Molar mass: 534.652 g·mol^{−1}
- 3D model (JSmol): Interactive image
- SMILES: CC1CC2=CC(=CC(=C2C3C1C4CCC(C4(CC3)C)(C#C)O)OC(=O)C5=CC=CC=C5)OC(=O)C6=CC=CC=C6
- InChI: InChI=1S/C35H34O5/c1-4-35(38)18-16-28-30-22(2)19-25-20-26(39-32(36)23-11-7-5-8-12-23)21-29(31(25)27(30)15-17-34(28,35)3)40-33(37)24-13-9-6-10-14-24/h1,5-14,20-22,27-28,30,38H,15-19H2,2-3H3/t22-,27+,28+,30-,34+,35+/m1/s1; Key:FMEKKTLRKMEQKJ-RCJJHWPHSA-N

Etamestrol (INN; also known as eptamestrol and 7α-methyl-19-nor-17α-pregna-1,3,5(10)-trien-20-yne-1,3,17-triol 1,3-dibenzoate; development code ZK-77992) is a synthetic, steroidal estrogen described as an ovulation inhibitor (or hormonal contraceptive) that was synthesized in 1979 but was never marketed.
