= Alfatradiol/dexamethasone =

Medication for hair loss

Combination of
- Alfatradiol: 5α-reductase inhibitor
- Dexamethasone: Glucocorticoid

Clinical data
- Trade names: Ell-Cranell dexa
- Pregnancy category: Embryotoxic in animal studies
- Routes of administration: Topical

Legal status
- Legal status: In general: ℞ (Prescription only)

Identifiers
- CAS Number: None

The drug combination alfatradiol/dexamethasone, with a trade name Ell-Cranell dexa in Germany, is used topically for the treatment of mild to moderate androgenic alopecia (hair loss) in younger women.
