= Estradiol 17alpha-dehydrogenase =

Estradio l 17alpha-dehydrogenase

Identifiers
- EC no.: 1.1.1.148
- CAS no.: 9044-91-1

Databases
- IntEnz: IntEnz view
- BRENDA: BRENDA entry
- ExPASy: NiceZyme view
- KEGG: KEGG entry
- MetaCyc: metabolic pathway
- PRIAM: profile
- PDB structures: RCSB PDB PDBe PDBsum
- Gene Ontology: AmiGO / QuickGO
Search
- PMC: articles
- PubMed: articles
- NCBI: proteins

In enzymology, estradiol 17alpha-dehydrogenase (EC 1.1.1.148) is an enzyme that catalyzes the chemical reaction:

17α-estradiol
+ NAD^{+}
H^{+}
H^{+}
estrone
+ NADH

The two substrates of this enzyme are 17α-estradiol and reduced nicotinamide adenine dinucleotide (NAD^{+}). Its products are estrone, reduced NADH, and a proton. The enzyme can also use the alternative cofactor, nicotinamide adenine dinucleotide phosphate.

Estradiol 17alpha-dehydrogenase belongs to the oxidoreductase family, specifically those acting on the CH-OH group of donors with NAD^{+} or NADP^{+} as acceptors. The systematic name for this enzyme class is 17alpha-hydroxysteroid:NAD(P)^{+} 17-oxidoreductase. Commonly used names include 17alpha-estradiol dehydrogenase, 17alpha-hydroxy steroid dehydrogenase, 17alpha-hydroxy steroid oxidoreductase, 17alpha-hydroxysteroid oxidoreductase, and estradiol 17alpha-oxidoreductase. This enzyme plays a crucial role in both androgen and estrogen metabolism.

== Discovery and Research ==
The partial purification of 17 alpha- and 17 beta-estradiol dehydrogenase activities from chicken liver was reported by Renwick AG and Engel LL in 1967, shedding light on the enzyme's properties and functions. Subsequent research has further elucidated its physiological significance, with ongoing studies aiming to understand its regulation and potential therapeutic applications.
