= Hippulin =

Chemical compound

Clinical data
- Other names: Δ^{8}-14-Isoestrone; 8-Dehydro-14-isoestrone; 14-Isoestra-1,3,5(10),8-tetraen-3-ol-17-one
- Routes of administration: By mouth
- Drug class: Estrogen

Identifiers
- IUPAC name: (13S,14R)-3-hydroxy-13-methyl-7,11,12,14,15,16-hexahydro-6H-cyclopenta[a]phenanthren-17-one
- CAS Number: 474-87-3
- PubChem CID: 6451472
- ChemSpider: 4953937
- UNII: 7C1N8RKG9F

Chemical and physical data
- Formula: C_{18}H_{20}O_{2}
- Molar mass: 268.356 g·mol^{−1}
- 3D model (JSmol): Interactive image
- SMILES: C[C@]12CCC3=C([C@@H]1CCC2=O)CCc4c3ccc(c4)O
- InChI: InChI=1S/C18H20O2/c1-18-9-8-14-13-5-3-12(19)10-11(13)2-4-15(14)16(18)6-7-17(18)20/h3,5,10,16,19H,2,4,6-9H2,1H3/t16-,18-/m0/s1; Key:OUGSRCWSHMWPQE-WMZOPIPTSA-N

Hippulin, also known as Δ^{8}-14-isoestrone, as well as 14-isoestra-1,3,5(10),8-tetraen-3-ol-17-one, is a naturally occurring estrogen found in horses and an isomer of equilin. The compound, likely in sodium sulfate form, is a component of conjugated estrogens (Premarin), a pharmaceutical extract of the urine of pregnant mares, though it is present only in small amounts in pregnant mare urine. It has been reported by possess either equivalent estrogenic activity to that of equilin or only slight estrogenic activity. The compound was first described in 1932.

== See also ==
- List of estrogens § Equine estrogens
