= Epimestrol =

Chemical compound

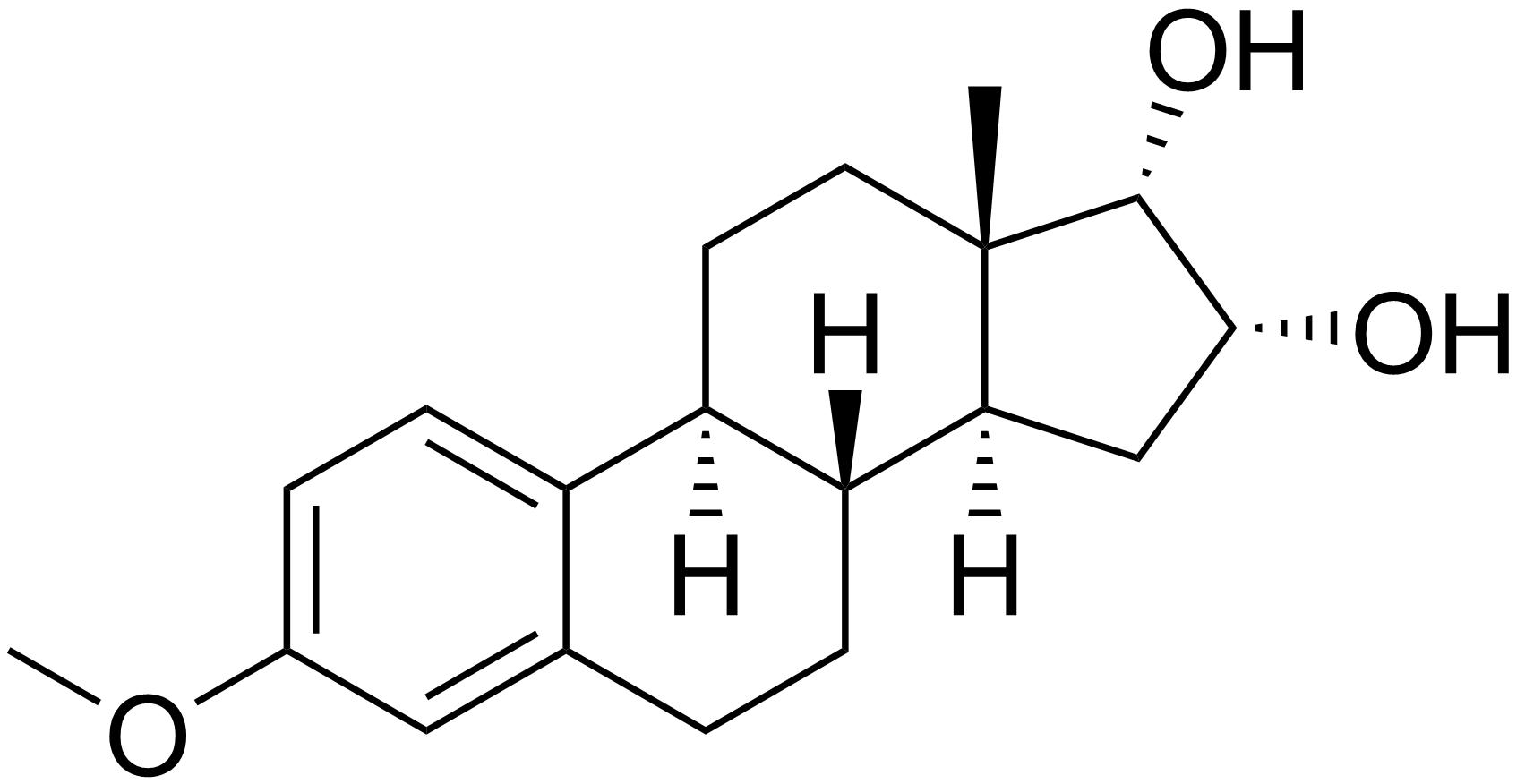

Clinical data
- Trade names: Alene, Stimovul
- Other names: Stimovul; ORG-817; NSC-55975; 3-Methoxyestriol; 3-Methoxy-17-epiestriol
- Routes of administration: By mouth
- Drug class: Estrogen; Estrogen ether
- ATC code: G03GB03 (WHO)

Identifiers
- IUPAC name: (8R,9S,13S,14S,16R,17S)-3-methoxy-13-methyl-6,7,8,9,11,12,14,15,16,17-decahydrocyclopenta[a]phenanthrene-16,17-diol
- CAS Number: 7004-98-0
- PubChem CID: 244809
- ChemSpider: 214111
- UNII: 7IVE3SDZ38
- KEGG: D04021
- CompTox Dashboard (EPA): DTXSID90859807
- ECHA InfoCard: 100.027.526

Chemical and physical data
- Formula: C_{19}H_{26}O_{3}
- Molar mass: 302.414 g·mol^{−1}
- 3D model (JSmol): Interactive image
- SMILES: O(C)c1ccc2[C@H]3CC[C@]4(C)[C@@]5([C@@]6C[C@H]4[C@@H]3CCc2c1).O6.O5
- InChI: InChI=1S/C19H26O3/c1-19-8-7-14-13-6-4-12(22-2)9-11(13)3-5-15(14)16(19)10-17(20)18(19)21/h4,6,9,14-18,20-21H,3,5,7-8,10H2,1-2H3/t14-,15-,16+,17-,18-,19+/m1/s1; Key:UHQGCIIQUZBJAE-RRQVMCLOSA-N

Epimestrol (INN, USAN, BAN) (brand names Alene, Stimovul; former developmental code name ORG-817), also known as 3-methoxy-17-epiestriol, is a synthetic, steroidal estrogen and an estrogen ether and prodrug of 17-epiestriol. It has been used as a component of ovulation induction in combination with gonadotropin-releasing hormone.

== See also ==
- List of estrogens
