= 8,9-Dehydroestradiol =

Chemical compound

Clinical data
- Other names: Δ^{8}-Estradiol; Δ^{8}-17β-Estradiol; Estra-1,3,5(10),8-tetraen-17β-ol-3-one
- Routes of administration: By mouth
- Drug class: Estrogen

Identifiers
- IUPAC name: (13S,14S,17S)-13-methyl-6,7,11,12,14,15,16,17-octahydrocyclopenta[a]phenanthrene-3,17-diol
- CAS Number: 23392-54-3
- ChemSpider: 8014038

Chemical and physical data
- Formula: C_{18}H_{22}O_{2}
- Molar mass: 270.372 g·mol^{−1}
- 3D model (JSmol): Interactive image
- SMILES: Oc4cc3c(/C1=C(/[C@@H]2CC[C@H](O)[C@]2(CC1)C)CC3)cc4
- InChI: InChI=InChI=1S/C18H22O2/c1-18-9-8-14-13-5-3-12(19)10-11(13)2-4-15(14)16(18)6-7-17(18)20/h3,5,10,16-17,19-20H,2,4,6-9H2,1H3/t16-,17-,18-/m0/s1; Key:UWYDUSMQFLTKBQ-BZSNNMDCSA-N

8,9-Dehydroestradiol, or Δ^{8}-17β-estradiol, also known as estra-1,3,5(10),8-tetraen-17β-ol-3-one, is a naturally occurring steroidal estrogen found in horses which is closely related to equilin, equilenin, and estradiol, and, as the 3-sulfate ester sodium salt, is a minor constituent of conjugated estrogens (Premarin). It is also an important active metabolite of 8,9-dehydroestrone, analogously to conversion of estrone or estrone sulfate into estradiol.

== See also ==
- List of estrogens § Equine estrogens
