= 17α-Epiestriol =

Names
- IUPAC name Estra-1,3,5(10)-triene-3,16α,17α-triol
- Systematic IUPAC name (1S,2R,3aS,3bR,9bS,11aS)-11a-Methyl-2,3,3a,3b,4,5,9b,10,11,11a-decahydro-1H-cyclopenta[a]phenanthrene-1,2,7-triol
- Other names 17-Epiestriol; 16α-Hydroxy-17α-estradiol; 3,16α,17α-Trihydroxy-1,3,5(10)-estratriene

Identifiers
CAS Number	1228-72-4
3D model (JSmol)	Interactive image
ChEBI	CHEBI:42156
ChEMBL	ChEMBL1232445
ChemSpider	225189
DrugBank	DB07702
PubChem CID	256737
UNII	4G7IHY560Z
CompTox Dashboard (EPA)	DTXSID00858947
- InChI: InChI=1S/C18H24O3/c1-18-7-6-13-12-5-3-11(19)8-10(12)2-4-14(13)15(18)9-16(20)17(18)21/h3,5,8,13-17,19-21H,2,4,6-7,9H2,1H3/t13-,14-,15+,16-,17-,18+/m1/s1 Key: PROQIPRRNZUXQM-PNVOZDDCSA-N
- SMILES: Oc1ccc2[C@H]3CC[C@]4(C)[C@@]5([C@@]6C[C@H]4[C@@H]3CCc2c1).O6.O5

Properties
Chemical formula	C_{18}H_{24}O_{3}
Molar mass	288.38136 g/mol
- Except where otherwise noted, data are given for materials in their standard state (at 25 °C [77 °F], 100 kPa). Infobox references

17α-Epiestriol, or simply 17-epiestriol, also known as 16α-hydroxy-17α-estradiol or estra-1,3,5(10)-triene-3,16α,17α-triol, is a minor and weak endogenous estrogen, and the 17α-epimer of estriol (which is 16α-hydroxy-17β-estradiol). It is formed from 16α-hydroxyestrone. In contrast to other endogenous estrogens like estradiol, 17α-epiestriol is a selective agonist of the ERβ. It is described as a relatively weak estrogen, which is in accordance with its relatively low affinity for the ERα. 17α-Epiestriol has been found to be approximately 400-fold more potent than estradiol in inhibiting tumor necrosis factor α (TNFα)-induced vascular cell adhesion molecule 1 (VCAM-1) expression in vitro.

Relative affinities (%) of 17α-epiestriol and related steroids
Compound	PR	AR	ER	GR	MR	SHBG	CBG
Estradiol	2.6	7.9	100	0.6	0.13	8.7	<0.1
Alfatradiol	<1	<1	15	<1	<1	?	?
Estriol	<1	<1	15	<1	<1	?	?
16β-Epiestriol	<1	<1	20	<1	<1	?	?
17α-Epiestriol	<1	<1	31	<1	<1	?	?
Values are percentages (%). Reference ligands (100%) were progesterone for the PR, testosterone for the AR, E2 for the ER, DEXA for the GR, aldosterone for the MR, DHT for SHBG, and cortisol for CBG.

== See also ==
- Epimestrol
- 16β,17α-Epiestriol
- 16β-Epiestriol
- 17α-Estradiol
- 2-Methoxyestradiol
