= Estradiol disulfate =

Chemical compound

Names
- IUPAC name [(8R,9S,13S,14S,17S)-13-Methyl-3-sulfooxy-6,7,8,9,11,12,14,15,16,17-decahydrocyclopenta[a]phenanthren-17-yl] hydrogen sulfate
- Other names E2DS; Estradiol 3,17β-disulfate

Identifiers
CAS Number	3233-70-3
3D model (JSmol)	Interactive image
ChEMBL	ChEMBL1162492
ChemSpider	59803
KEGG	C045407
PubChem CID	66430
UNII	SF3WLQ8DVX
CompTox Dashboard (EPA)	DTXSID50186065
- InChI: InChI=1S/C18H24O8S2/c1-18-9-8-14-13-5-3-12(25-27(19,20)21)10-11(13)2-4-15(14)16(18)6-7-17(18)26-28(22,23)24/h3,5,10,14-17H,2,4,6-9H2,1H3,(H,19,20,21)(H,22,23,24)/t14-,15-,16+,17+,18+/m1/s1 Key: VPLAJGAMHNQZIY-ZBRFXRBCSA-N
- SMILES: C[C@]12CC[C@H]3[C@H]([C@@H]1CC[C@@H]2OS(=O)(=O)O)CCC4=C3C=CC(=C4)OS(=O)(=O)O

Properties
Chemical formula	C_{18}H_{24}O_{8}S_{2}
Molar mass	432.50 g·mol^{−1}
- Except where otherwise noted, data are given for materials in their standard state (at 25 °C [77 °F], 100 kPa). Infobox references

Estradiol disulfate (also known as E2DS or estradiol 3,17β-disulfate) is an endogenous estrogen conjugate and metabolite of estradiol. It is related to estradiol 3-sulfate and estradiol 17β-sulfate. Estradiol disulfate has 0.0004% of the relative binding affinity of estradiol for the estrogen receptor alpha (ERα), one of the two estrogen receptors (ERs).

== See also ==
- Catechol estrogen
- Estrogen conjugate
- Lipoidal estradiol
- List of estrogen esters § Estradiol esters
