= 16β,17α-Epiestriol =

Names
- IUPAC name Estra-1,3,5(10)-triene-3,16β,17α-triol
- Systematic IUPAC name (1S,2S,3aS,3bR,9bS,11aS)-11a-Methyl-2,3,3a,3b,4,5,9b,10,11,11a-decahydro-1H-cyclopenta[a]phenanthrene-1,2,7-triol

Identifiers
CAS Number	793-89-5
3D model (JSmol)	Interactive image
ChemSpider	13628086
PubChem CID	21252247
CompTox Dashboard (EPA)	DTXSID60611651
- InChI: InChI=1S/C18H24O3/c1-18-7-6-13-12-5-3-11(19)8-10(12)2-4-14(13)15(18)9-16(20)17(18)21/h3,5,8,13-17,19-21H,2,4,6-7,9H2,1H3/t13-,14-,15+,16+,17-,18+/m1/s1
- SMILES: Oc1ccc2[C@H]3CC[C@]4(C)[C@@]5([C@]6C[C@H]4[C@@H]3CCc2c1).O6.O5

Properties
Chemical formula	C_{18}H_{24}O_{3}
Molar mass	288.387 g·mol^{−1}
- Except where otherwise noted, data are given for materials in their standard state (at 25 °C [77 °F], 100 kPa). Infobox references

16β,17α-Epiestriol, or 16,17-epiestriol, also known as 16β-hydroxy-17α-estradiol, as well as estra-1,3,5(10)-triene-3,16β,17α-triol, is a minor and weak endogenous steroidal estrogen that is related to 17α-estradiol and estriol. Along with estriol, 16β,17α-epiestriol has been detected in the urine of women during the late pregnancy stage. It shows preferential affinity for the ERβ over the ERα.

== See also ==
- 16β-Epiestriol
- 17α-Epiestriol
- Epimestrol
