= 8,9-Dehydroestrone =

Chemical compound

Clinical data
- Other names: Δ^{8}-Estrone; Estra-1,3,5(10),8-tetraen-3-ol-17-one
- Routes of administration: By mouth
- Drug class: Estrogen

Identifiers
- IUPAC name: (13S,14S)-3-Hydroxy-13-methyl-7,11,12,14,15,16-hexahydro-6H-cyclopenta[a]phenanthren-17-one
- CAS Number: 474-87-3
- PubChem CID: 6451472
- ChemSpider: 4953937
- UNII: 7C1N8RKG9F
- CompTox Dashboard (EPA): DTXSID40197125

Chemical and physical data
- Formula: C_{18}H_{20}O_{2}
- Molar mass: 268.356 g·mol^{−1}
- 3D model (JSmol): Interactive image
- SMILES: C[C@]12CCC3=C([C@@H]1CCC2=O)CCC4=C3C=CC(=C4)O
- InChI: InChI=1S/C18H20O2/c1-18-9-8-14-13-5-3-12(19)10-11(13)2-4-15(14)16(18)6-7-17(18)20/h3,5,10,16,19H,2,4,6-9H2,1H3/t16-,18-/m0/s1; Key:OUGSRCWSHMWPQE-WMZOPIPTSA-N

8,9-Dehydroestrone, or Δ^{8}-estrone, also known as estra-1,3,5(10),8-tetraen-3-ol-17-one, is a naturally occurring estrogen found in horses which is closely related to equilin, equilenin, and estrone, and, as the 3-sulfate ester sodium salt, is a minor constituent (3.5%) of conjugated estrogens (Premarin). It produces 8,9-dehydro-17β-estradiol as an important active metabolite, analogously to conversion of estrone or estrone sulfate into estradiol. The compound was first described in 1997. In addition to 8,9-dehydroestrone and 8,9-dehydro-17β-estradiol, 8,9-dehydro-17α-estradiol is likely also to be present in conjugated estrogens, but has not been identified at this time.

== See also ==
- List of estrogens § Equine estrogens
