= Epiestriol =

Chemical compound

Clinical data
- Trade names: Actriol, Arcagynil, Klimadoral
- Other names: Epioestriol; 16β-Epiestriol; 16-Epiestriol; 16β-Hydroxy-17β-estradiol
- Routes of administration: By mouth
- Drug class: Estrogen

Identifiers
- IUPAC name: (8R,9S,13S,14S,16S,17R)-13-methyl-6,7,8,9,11,12,14,15,16,17-decahydrocyclopenta[a]phenanthrene-3,16,17-triol
- CAS Number: 547-81-9
- PubChem CID: 68929
- ChemSpider: 62155
- UNII: 8XZ32LI44K
- ChEMBL: ChEMBL1908074
- CompTox Dashboard (EPA): DTXSID10894790
- ECHA InfoCard: 100.008.126

Chemical and physical data
- Formula: C_{18}H_{24}O_{3}
- Molar mass: 288.387 g·mol^{−1}
- 3D model (JSmol): Interactive image
- SMILES: Oc1ccc2[C@H]3CC[C@]4(C)[C@]5([C@]6C[C@H]4[C@@H]3CCc2c1).O6.O5
- InChI: InChI=1S/C18H24O3/c1-18-7-6-13-12-5-3-11(19)8-10(12)2-4-14(13)15(18)9-16(20)17(18)21/h3,5,8,13-17,19-21H,2,4,6-7,9H2,1H3/t13-,14-,15+,16+,17+,18+/m1/s1; Key:PROQIPRRNZUXQM-ZMSHIADSSA-N

Epiestriol (INN) (brand names Actriol, Arcagynil, Klimadoral), or epioestriol (BAN), also known as 16β-epiestriol or simply 16-epiestriol, as well as 16β-hydroxy-17β-estradiol, is a minor and weak endogenous estrogen, and the 16β-epimer of estriol (which is 16α-hydroxy-17β-estradiol). Epiestriol is (or has previously been) used clinically in the treatment of acne. In addition to its estrogenic actions, epiestriol has been found to possess significant anti-inflammatory properties without glycogenic activity or immunosuppressive effects, an interesting finding that is in contrast to conventional anti-inflammatory steroids such as hydrocortisone (a glucocorticoid).

Relative affinities (%) of epiestriol and related steroids
Compound	PR	AR	ER	GR	MR	SHBG	CBG
Estradiol	2.6	7.9	100	0.6	0.13	8.7	<0.1
Alfatradiol	<1	<1	15	<1	<1	?	?
Estriol	<1	<1	15	<1	<1	?	?
16β-Epiestriol	<1	<1	20	<1	<1	?	?
17α-Epiestriol	<1	<1	31	<1	<1	?	?
Values are percentages (%). Reference ligands (100%) were progesterone for the PR, testosterone for the AR, E2 for the ER, DEXA for the GR, aldosterone for the MR, DHT for SHBG, and cortisol for CBG.

== See also ==
- 17α-Epiestriol
- 16β,17α-Epiestriol
- Epimestrol
- Mytatrienediol
