= Estriol succinate =

Chemical compound

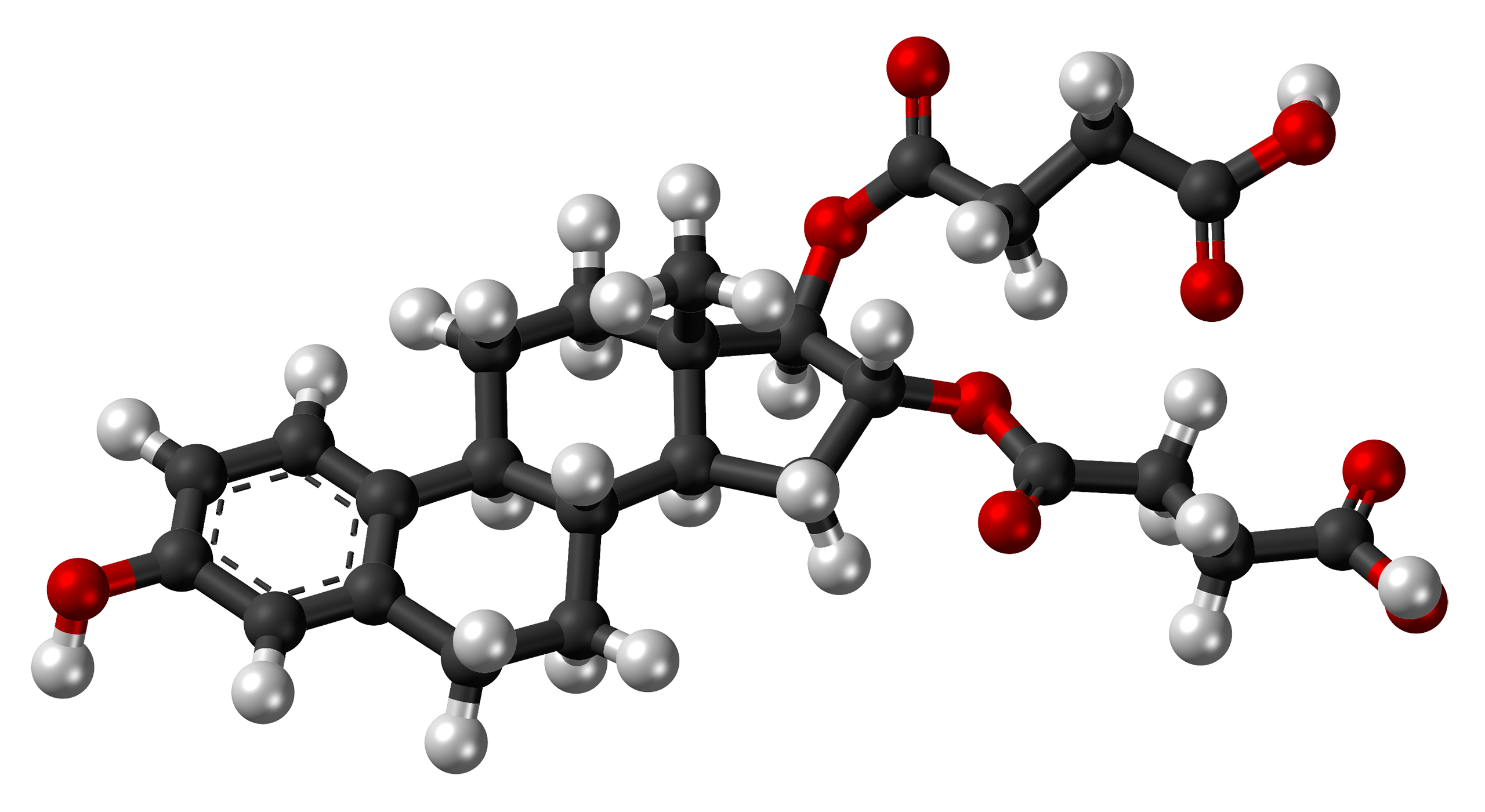

Clinical data
- Trade names: Synapause, others
- Other names: Oestriol succinate; Estriol disuccinate; Estriol hemisuccinate; Succinylestriol; Estriol 16α,17β-di(hydrogen succinate)
- Routes of administration: By mouth, vaginal
- Drug class: Estrogen; Estrogen ester

Identifiers
- IUPAC name: 4-{[(8R,9S,13S,14S,16R,17R)-17-(3-carboxypropanoyloxy)-3-hydroxy-13-methyl-6,7,8,9,11,12,14,15,16,17-decahydrocyclopenta[a]phenanthren-16-yl]oxy}-4-oxobutanoic acid
- CAS Number: 514-68-1
- PubChem CID: 10577
- ChemSpider: 10133
- UNII: AS13K2DY03
- KEGG: D07920
- ChEBI: CHEBI:135790
- CompTox Dashboard (EPA): DTXSID401023693
- ECHA InfoCard: 100.007.442

Chemical and physical data
- Formula: C_{26}H_{32}O_{9}
- Molar mass: 488.533 g·mol^{−1}
- 3D model (JSmol): Interactive image
- SMILES: C[C@]12CC[C@H]3[C@@H](CCc4cc(O)ccc34)[C@@H]1C[C@@H](OC(=O)CCC(O)=O)[C@@H]2OC(=O)CCC(O)=O
- InChI: InChI=1S/C26H32O9/c1-26-11-10-17-16-5-3-15(27)12-14(16)2-4-18(17)19(26)13-20(34-23(32)8-6-21(28)29)25(26)35-24(33)9-7-22(30)31/h3,5,12,17-20,25,27H,2,4,6-11,13H2,1H3,(H,28,29)(H,30,31)/t17-,18-,19+,20-,25+,26+/m1/s1; Key:VBRVDDFOBZNCPF-BRSFZVHSSA-N

Estriol succinate, sold under the brand name Synapause among others, is an estrogen medication which is used in the treatment of menopausal symptoms. It is taken by mouth, in through the vagina, and by injection.

== Medical uses ==
Estriol succinate is used in menopausal hormone therapy in the treatment and prevention of menopausal symptoms such as hot flashes, vaginal atrophy, and osteoporosis. Unlike other estrogens, depending on how it is used (i.e., how often it is taken and at what dosage), estriol succinate may not require concomitant therapy with a progestogen to prevent endometrial hyperplasia and endometrial cancer in women with intact uteruses.

The clinical effects of estriol succinate in the treatment of menopausal symptoms have been characterized in a large 5-year clinical trial of 911 menopausal women.

=== Available forms ===
Estriol succinate is and has been available in the form of 2 and 4 mg oral tablets, as a 0.1% vaginal cream, and as a 20 mg vial for use by injection.

== Pharmacology ==
Estriol succinate is an estrogen ester, specifically, an ester of estriol, and acts as a prodrug of estriol in the body. It is described as a weak estrogen in comparison to estradiol valerate. Estriol succinate is used medically via oral and vaginal routes similarly. In estriol succinate, two of the hydroxyl groups of estriol, those at the C16α and C17β positions, are esterified with succinic acid. As such, when adjusted for differences in molecular weight, a dose of 2 mg estriol succinate is equivalent to 1.18 mg unconjugated estriol. Unlike other estrogen esters, such as estradiol valerate, estriol succinate is hydrolyzed almost not at all in the intestinal mucosa when taken orally, and in relation to this, is absorbed more slowly than is estriol. Consequently, oral estriol succinate is a longer-acting form of estriol than oral estriol. Instead of in the gastrointestinal tract, oral estriol succinate is cleaved into estriol mainly in the liver. After a single 8 mg oral dose of estriol succinate, maximum levels of circulating estriol of 40 pg/mL are attained within 12 hours, and this increases up to 80 pg/mL with continued daily administration.

Potencies of oral estrogens
Compound	Dosage for specific uses (mg usually) (Note: Dosages are given in milligrams unless otherwise noted.)					
Compound	ETD (Note: Dosed every 2 to 3 weeks)	EPD	MSD	MSD (Note: Dosed daily)	OID	TSD
Estradiol (non-micronized)	30	≥120–300	120	6	-	-
Estradiol (micronized)	6–12	60–80	14–42	1–2	>5	>8
Estradiol valerate	6–12	60–80	14–42	1–2	-	>8
Estradiol benzoate	-	60–140	-	-	-	-
Estriol	≥20	120–150 (Note: In divided doses, 3x/day; irregular and atypical proliferation.)	28–126	1–6	>5	-
Estriol succinate	-	140–150	28–126	2–6	-	-
Estrone sulfate	12	60	42	2	-	-
Conjugated estrogens	5–12	60–80	8.4–25	0.625–1.25	>3.75	7.5
Ethinylestradiol	200 μg	1–2	280 μg	20–40 μg	100 μg	100 μg
Mestranol	300 μg	1.5–3.0	300–600 μg	25–30 μg	>80 μg	-
Quinestrol	300 μg	2–4	500 μg	25–50 μg	-	-
Methylestradiol	-	2	-	-	-	-
Diethylstilbestrol	2.5	20–30	11	0.5–2.0	>5	3
DES dipropionate	-	15–30	-	-	-	-
Dienestrol	5	30–40	42	0.5–4.0	-	-
Dienestrol diacetate	3–5	30–60	-	-	-	-
Hexestrol	-	70–110	-	-	-	-
Chlorotrianisene	-	>100	-	-	>48	-
Methallenestril	-	400	-	-	-	-
Sources and footnotes:

== Chemistry ==
Estriol succinate, also known as estriol disuccinate or as estriol 16α,17β-di(hydrogen succinate), is a synthetic estrane steroid and a derivative of estriol. It is specifically the C16α and C17β disuccinate ester of estriol. The medication is provided both as estriol succinate and as estriol sodium succinate, the sodium salt. Other marketed estriol esters besides estriol succinate include estriol acetate benzoate and estriol tripropionate, whereas estriol dihexanoate, estriol dipropionate, and estriol triacetate are estriol esters that were never marketed. Quinestradol is an estriol ether and has also been marketed. Polyestriol phosphate is an ester of estriol in the form of a polymer, and was previously marketed.

== History ==
Estriol succinate was introduced for medical use in 1966.

== Society and culture ==
=== Generic names ===
Estriol succinate is the generic name of the drug and its INN and BAN. Other synonyms include oestriol succinate, estriol disuccinate, and estriol hemisuccinate. When provided as the sodium salt, estriol succinate is known as estriol sodium succinate (BAN) or as oestriol sodium succinate.

=== Brand names ===
Estriol succinate has been marketed under brand names including Blissel, Evalon, Gelistrol, Hemostyptanon, Orgastyptin, Ovestin, Sinapause, Styptanon, Synapsa, Synapasa, Synapausa, and Synapause, among others. Estriol sodium succinate has been marketed specifically under the brand names Pausan and Styptanon.

=== Availability ===
Estriol succinate is or has been marketed in Europe, Hong Kong, and Mexico.

== Research ==
Estriol succinate was under development for the treatment of multiple sclerosis in the United States and worldwide, and reached phase II clinical trials for this indication, but development was discontinued due to insufficient effectiveness. It had the tentative brand name Trimesta.
