= C18H22O3 =

The molecular formula C_{18}H_{22}O_{3} may refer to:

- Hydroxyestrones
  - 2-Hydroxyestrone
  - 4-Hydroxyestrone
  - 16α-Hydroxyestrone
  - 16β-Hydroxyestrone
- 16-Ketoestradiol
- Methallenestril
