= C16H18O2 =

The molecular formula C_{16}H_{18}O_{2} (molar mass: 242.31 g/mol, exact mass: 242.1307 u) may refer to:

- rac-Butestrol
- meso-Butestrol
