= C20H24O3 =

The molecular formula C_{20}H_{24}O_{3} (molar mass: 312.40 g/mol) may refer to:

- Estrone acetate
- Ethinyl estriol (EE3), or 17α-ethynylestriol
- Trenbolone acetate
