= Ent-Estradiol =

Chemical compound

ent-Estradiol

Clinical data
- Other names: ent-E2; 1-Estradiol; 1-E2
- Drug class: Estrogen

Identifiers
- IUPAC name: (8S,9R,13R,14R,17R)-13-methyl-6,7,8,9,11,12,14,15,16,17-decahydrocyclopenta[a]phenanthrene-3,17-diol
- CAS Number: 3736-22-9
- PubChem CID: 667515
- ChemSpider: 580891
- UNII: VW299DJ6U7
- CompTox Dashboard (EPA): DTXSID60912332

Chemical and physical data
- Formula: C_{18}H_{24}O_{2}
- Molar mass: 272.388 g·mol^{−1}
- 3D model (JSmol): Interactive image
- SMILES: C[C@@]12CC[C@@H]3[C@@H]([C@H]1CC[C@H]2O)CCC4=C3C=CC(=C4)O
- InChI: InChI=1S/C18H24O2/c1-18-9-8-14-13-5-3-12(19)10-11(13)2-4-15(14)16(18)6-7-17(18)20/h3,5,10,14-17,19-20H,2,4,6-9H2,1H3/t14-,15-,16+,17+,18+/m0/s1; Key:VOXZDWNPVJITMN-QXDIGNSFSA-N

ent-Estradiol (ent-E2), or 1-estradiol (1-E2), is an estrogen and the 1-enantiomorph of estradiol. It is a so-called "short-acting" or "impeded" estrogen, similarly to estriol, 17α-estradiol, and dimethylstilbestrol.
