= C18H20O3 =

The molecular formula C_{18}H_{20}O_{3} (molar mass: 284.350 g/mol) may refer to:

- Bisdehydrodoisynolic acid (BDDA)
- 16-Ketoestrone (16-Keto-E1)
- Minquartynoic acid
