= C24H32O5 =

The molecular formula C_{24}H_{32}O_{5} (molar mass: 400.51 g/mol, exact mass: 400.2250 u) may refer to:

- Estriol dipropionate, or estriol 3,17β-dipropionate
- Marinobufagenin
- Mexrenone
