= C24H32O9 =

The molecular formula C_{24}H_{32}O_{9} (molar mass: 464.50 g/mol, exact mass: 464.2046 u) may refer to:

- Estriol 16-glucuronide
- Estriol 3-glucuronide
