= C24H30O6 =

The molecular formula C_{24}H_{30}O_{6} may refer to:

- Eplerenone, a steroidal antimineralocorticoid of the spirolactone group
- Estriol triacetate, an estrogen medication and an estrogen ester
