= 16-Ketoestrone =

Names
- IUPAC name 3-Hydroxyestra-1,3,5(10)-triene-16,17-dione
- Systematic IUPAC name (3aS,3bR,9bS,11aS)-7-Hydroxy-11a-methyl-3a,3b,4,5,9b,10,11,11a-octahydro-1H-cyclopenta[a]phenanthrene-1,2(3H)-dione
- Other names 16-Oxoestrone; 16-Keto-E1; 16-Oxo-E1; NSC-60462

Identifiers
CAS Number	1228-73-5
3D model (JSmol)	Interactive image
ChEBI	CHEBI:34166
ChemSpider	216072
KEGG	C14441
PubChem CID	246876
UNII	113V416QTU
CompTox Dashboard (EPA)	DTXSID701261036
- InChI: InChI=1S/C18H20O3/c1-18-7-6-13-12-5-3-11(19)8-10(12)2-4-14(13)15(18)9-16(20)17(18)21/h3,5,8,13-15,19H,2,4,6-7,9H2,1H3/t13-,14-,15+,18+/m1/s1 Key: ANPHVANSJXDRTP-BSXFFOKHSA-N
- SMILES: C[C@]12CC[C@H]3[C@H]([C@@H]1CC(=O)C2=O)CCC4=C3C=CC(=C4)O

Properties
Chemical formula	C_{18}H_{20}O_{3}
Molar mass	284.355 g·mol^{−1}
- Except where otherwise noted, data are given for materials in their standard state (at 25 °C [77 °F], 100 kPa). Infobox references

16-Ketoestrone (16-keto-E1, or 16-oxoestrone, or 16-oxo-E1) is an endogenous estrogen related to 16α-hydroxyestrone and 16β-hydroxyestrone. In contrast to 16α-hydroxyestrone and 16β-hydroxyestrone, but similarly to 16-ketoestradiol, 16-ketoestrone is a very weak estrogen with less than 1/1000 the estrogenic potency of estrone in the uterus. 16-Ketoestrone has been reported to act as an inhibitor of 17β-hydroxysteroid dehydrogenases. 16-Ketoestrone can be converted by 16α-hydroxysteroid dehydrogenase into estriol in the body.
