= Hydroxyestrone =

Hydroxyestrone may refer to:

- 2-Hydroxyestrone
- 4-Hydroxyestrone
- 16α-Hydroxyestrone
- 16β-Hydroxyestrone
