= Estrone acetate =

Chemical compound

Identifiers
- IUPAC name: [(8R,9S,13S,14S)-13-methyl-17-oxo-7,8,9,11,12,14,15,16-octahydro-6H-cyclopenta[a]phenanthren-3-yl] acetate
- CAS Number: 901-93-9
- PubChem CID: 92846
- ChemSpider: 83814
- UNII: 4L6USG266B
- ChEMBL: ChEMBL1627997
- CompTox Dashboard (EPA): DTXSID801009160
- ECHA InfoCard: 100.163.707

Chemical and physical data
- Formula: C_{20}H_{24}O_{3}
- Molar mass: 312.409 g·mol^{−1}
- 3D model (JSmol): Interactive image
- SMILES: CC(=O)Oc1ccc2[C@H]3CC[C@@]4(C)[C@@H](CCC4=O)[C@@H]3CCc2c1
- InChI: InChI=1S/C20H24O3/c1-12(21)23-14-4-6-15-13(11-14)3-5-17-16(15)9-10-20(2)18(17)7-8-19(20)22/h4,6,11,16-18H,3,5,7-10H2,1-2H3/t16-,17-,18+,20+/m1/s1; Key:KDPQTPZDVJHMET-XSYGEPLQSA-N

Estrone acetate (brand name Hovigal) is a semisynthetic, steroidal estrogen. It is an estrogen ester, specifically, an ester of estrone.

== See also ==
- Hydroxyestrone diacetate
- Estradiol acetate
- Estriol triacetate
