= 16-Ketoestradiol =

Names
- IUPAC name 3,17β-Dihydroxyestra-1,3,5(10)-trien-16-one
- Systematic IUPAC name (1R,3aS,3bR,9bS,11aS)-1,7-Dihydroxy-11a-methyl-1,3,3a,3b,4,5,9b,10,11,11a-decahydro-2H-cyclopenta[a]phenanthren-2-one
- Other names 17-Oxoestradiol; 17-Oxo-estradiol; 17-Keto-E2; 17-Oxo-E2; 16-Oxo-estra-1,3,5(10)-trien-3,17β-diol; NSC-51169

Identifiers
CAS Number	566-75-6
3D model (JSmol)	Interactive image
ChEBI	CHEBI:34165
ChEMBL	ChEMBL1627347
ChemSpider	59791
KEGG	C14383
PubChem CID	66417
UNII	6CE096RR70
CompTox Dashboard (EPA)	DTXSID5040386
- InChI: InChI=1S/C18H22O3/c1-18-7-6-13-12-5-3-11(19)8-10(12)2-4-14(13)15(18)9-16(20)17(18)21/h3,5,8,13-15,17,19,21H,2,4,6-7,9H2,1H3/t13-,14-,15+,17+,18+/m1/s1 Key: KJDGFQJCHFJTRH-YONAWACDSA-N
- SMILES: C[C@]12CC[C@H]3[C@H]([C@@H]1CC(=O)[C@@H]2O)CCC4=C3C=CC(=C4)O

Properties
Chemical formula	C_{18}H_{22}O_{3}
Molar mass	286.371 g·mol^{−1}
- Except where otherwise noted, data are given for materials in their standard state (at 25 °C [77 °F], 100 kPa). Infobox references

16-Ketoestradiol (16-keto-E2, 16-oxoestradiol, or 16-oxo-E2) is an endogenous estrogen related to 16-ketoestrone. 16-Ketoestrone is a very weak estrogen with only 1/1000 the estrogenic potency of estradiol in the uterus. It is a so-called "short-acting" or "impeded" estrogen, similarly to estriol and dimethylstilbestrol.

== See also ==
- 16-Ketoestrone
