= Nilestriol =

Chemical compound

Clinical data
- Trade names: Wei Ni An
- Other names: Nylestriol; LY-49825; Ethinylestriol cyclopentyl ether; EE3CPE; 17α-Ethynylestriol 3-cyclopentyl ether
- Routes of administration: By mouth
- Drug class: Estrogen; Estrogen ether

Identifiers
- IUPAC name: (8R,9S,13S,14S,16R,17R)-3-cyclopentyloxy-17-ethynyl-13-methyl-7,8,9,11,12,14,15,16-octahydro-6H-cyclopenta[a]phenanthrene-16,17-diol
- CAS Number: 39791-20-3
- PubChem CID: 38346
- ChemSpider: 35146
- UNII: 7JA3B3IALU
- KEGG: D05212
- ChEMBL: ChEMBL2104468
- CompTox Dashboard (EPA): DTXSID601043308

Chemical and physical data
- Formula: C_{25}H_{32}O_{3}
- Molar mass: 380.528 g·mol^{−1}
- 3D model (JSmol): Interactive image
- SMILES: C[C@]12CC[C@H]3[C@H]([C@@H]1C[C@H]([C@]2(C#C)O)O)CCC4=C3C=CC(=C4)OC5CCCC5
- InChI: InChI=1S/C25H32O3/c1-3-25(27)23(26)15-22-21-10-8-16-14-18(28-17-6-4-5-7-17)9-11-19(16)20(21)12-13-24(22,25)2/h1,9,11,14,17,20-23,26-27H,4-8,10,12-13,15H2,2H3/t20-,21-,22+,23-,24+,25+/m1/s1; Key:CHZJRGNDJLJLAW-RIQJQHKOSA-N

Nilestriol (INN) (brand name Wei Ni An; developmental code name LY-49825), also known as nylestriol (USAN, BAN), is a synthetic estrogen which was patented in 1971 and is marketed in China. It is the 3-cyclopentyl ether of ethinylestriol, and is also known as ethinylestriol cyclopentyl ether (EE3CPE). Nilestriol is a prodrug of ethinylestriol, and is a more potent estrogen in comparison. It is described as a slowly-metabolized, long-acting estrogen and derivative of estriol. Nilestriol was assessed in combination with levonorgestrel for the potential treatment of postmenopausal osteoporosis, but this formulation ultimately was not marketed.

== See also ==
- List of estrogen esters § Ethers of steroidal estrogens
