= Estriol acetate benzoate =

Chemical compound

Clinical data
- Trade names: Holin-Depot
- Other names: Oestriol diacetate benzoate; Estriol 3-benzoate 16,17-diacetate
- Routes of administration: Intramuscular injection
- Drug class: Estrogen; Estrogen ester

Identifiers
- IUPAC name: [(8R,9S,13S,14S,16R,17R)-16,17-diacetyloxy-13-methyl-6,7,8,9,11,12,14,15,16,17-decahydrocyclopenta[a]phenanthren-3-yl] benzoate
- CAS Number: 2508-47-6
- PubChem CID: 656637
- ChemSpider: 16348
- UNII: 64EY62BBUA
- KEGG: D01989
- CompTox Dashboard (EPA): DTXSID8057697

Chemical and physical data
- Formula: C_{29}H_{32}O_{6}
- Molar mass: 476.569 g·mol^{−1}
- 3D model (JSmol): Interactive image
- SMILES: CC(=O)O[C@@H]1C[C@H]2[C@@H]3CCC4=C([C@H]3CC[C@@]2([C@H]1OC(=O)C)C)C=CC(=C4)OC(=O)C5=CC=CC=C5
- InChI: InChI=1S/C29H32O6/c1-17(30)33-26-16-25-24-11-9-20-15-21(35-28(32)19-7-5-4-6-8-19)10-12-22(20)23(24)13-14-29(25,3)27(26)34-18(2)31/h4-8,10,12,15,23-27H,9,11,13-14,16H2,1-3H3/t23-,24-,25+,26-,27+,29+/m1/s1; Key:VQHGRIUWSVCJPX-HSZAMCLRSA-N

Estriol acetate benzoate (JAN) (brand name Holin-Depot), or oestriol diacetate benzoate (BAN), is an estrogen medication. It is an estrogen ester, specifically, an ester of estriol.

== See also ==
- List of estrogen esters § Estriol esters
