= Butestrol =

Chemical compound

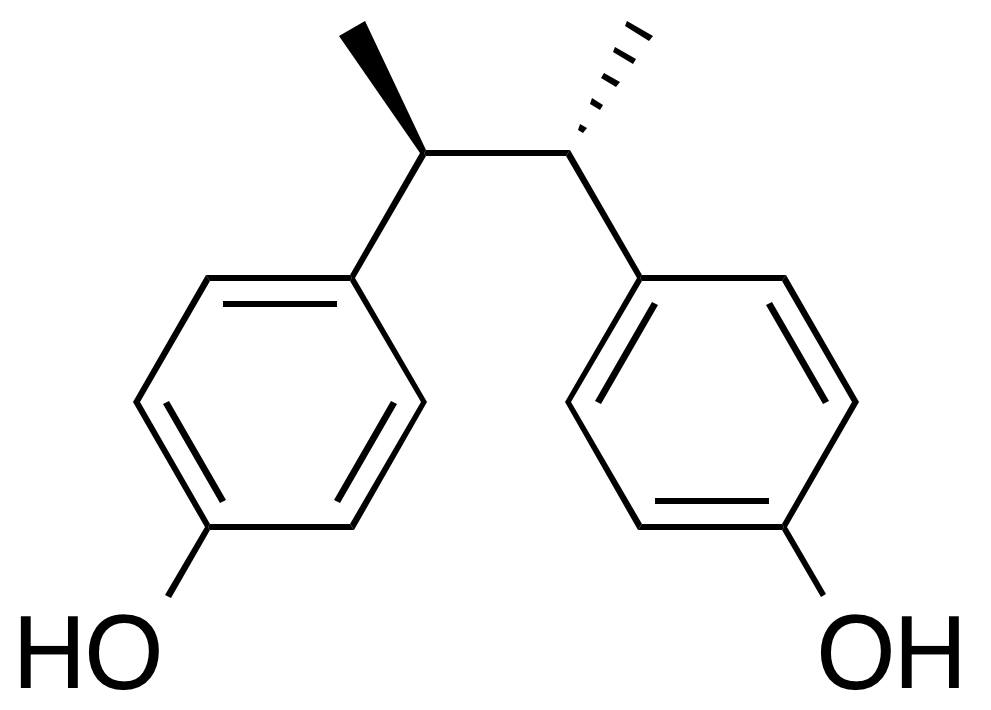

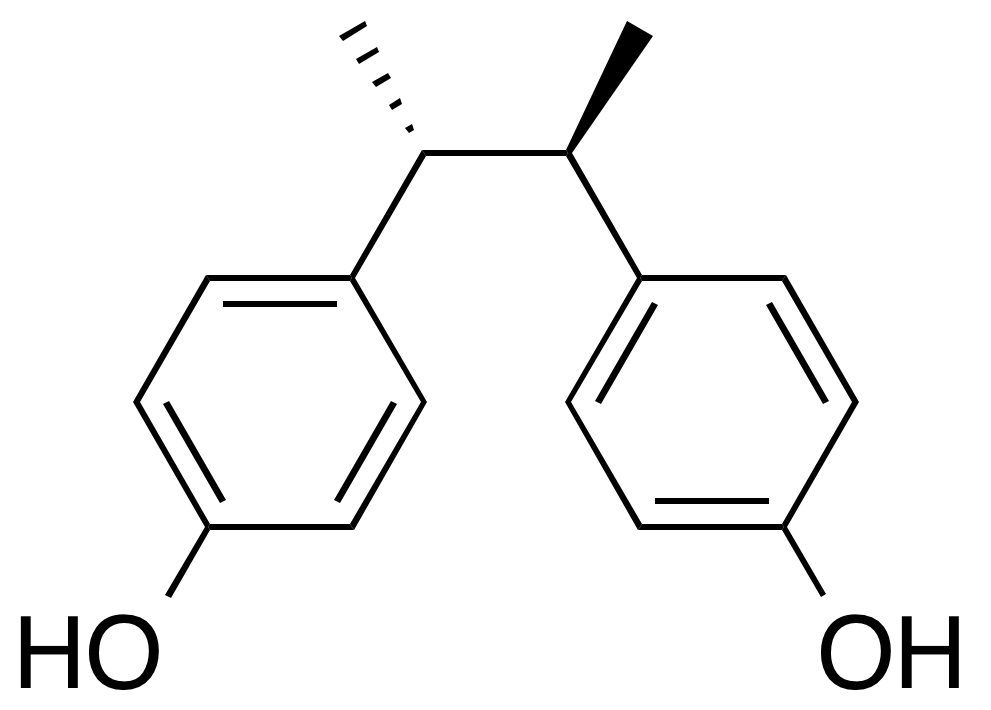
left: (S,S)-butestrol
right: (R,R)-butestrol

Clinical data
- Other names: Butoestrol; Racemic butestrol; rac-Butestrol; dl-Butestrol; Isobutestrol
- Drug class: Nonsteroidal estrogen

Identifiers
- IUPAC name: 4-[(2R,3R)-3-(4-hydroxyphenyl)butan-2-yl]phenol
- CAS Number: 5776-76-1
- PubChem CID: 197049
- ChemSpider: 170656
- UNII: 9S69QHQ4DU

Chemical and physical data
- Formula: C_{16}H_{18}O_{2}
- Molar mass: 242.318 g·mol^{−1}
- 3D model (JSmol): Interactive image
- SMILES: C[C@@H](C1=CC=C(C=C1)O)[C@@H](C)C2=CC=C(C=C2)O
- InChI: InChI=1S/C16H18O2/c1-11(13-3-7-15(17)8-4-13)12(2)14-5-9-16(18)10-6-14/h3-12,17-18H,1-2H3/t11-,12-/m1/s1; Key:GDUYFVYTXYOMSJ-VXGBXAGGSA-N

Butestrol, or racemic butestrol (rac-butestrol) is a synthetic nonsteroidal estrogen which was never marketed. It is structurally related to diethylstilbestrol and other stilbestrols.

== See also ==
- meso-Butestrol
