= Estriol dihexanoate =

Chemical compound

Clinical data
- Other names: Oestriol dihexanoate; Estriol 3,17β-dihexanoate; 16α-Hydroxyestra-1,3,5(10)-triene-3,17β-diyl dihexanoate
- Routes of administration: Intramuscular injection
- Drug class: Estrogen; Estrogen ester

Identifiers
- IUPAC name: [(8R,9S,13S,14S,16R,17R)-3-hexanoyloxy-16-hydroxy-13-methyl-6,7,8,9,11,12,14,15,16,17-decahydrocyclopenta[a]phenanthren-17-yl] hexanoate
- CAS Number: 104202-96-2
- PubChem CID: 128509
- ChemSpider: 113906
- UNII: J2K5XW8K72
- CompTox Dashboard (EPA): DTXSID90908869

Chemical and physical data
- Formula: C_{30}H_{44}O_{5}
- Molar mass: 484.677 g·mol^{−1}
- 3D model (JSmol): Interactive image
- SMILES: CCCCCC(=O)O[C@H]1[C@@H](C[C@@H]2[C@@]1(CC[C@H]3[C@H]2CCC4=C3C=CC(=C4)OC(=O)CCCCC)C)O
- InChI: InChI=1S/C30H44O5/c1-4-6-8-10-27(32)34-21-13-15-22-20(18-21)12-14-24-23(22)16-17-30(3)25(24)19-26(31)29(30)35-28(33)11-9-7-5-2/h13,15,18,23-26,29,31H,4-12,14,16-17,19H2,1-3H3/t23-,24-,25+,26-,29+,30+/m1/s1; Key:ZOVABFBGAYSQTL-AECPDVIXSA-N

Estriol dihexanoate, or estriol 3,17β-dihexanoate, is a synthetic estrogen and estrogen ester – specifically, the C3 and C17β dihexanoate ester of estriol – which was first described in 1963 and was never marketed. Following a single intramuscular injection of 8.90 mg estriol dihexanoate (equivalent to 5.0 mg estriol) in an oil solution, peak levels of estriol occurred after 2.1 to 3.4 days, an elimination half-life of 187 to 221 hours was observed, and estriol levels remained elevated for up to 20 to 50 days. For comparison, the durations of estriol and estriol dipropionate were far shorter.

== See also ==
- List of estrogen esters § Estriol esters
