= Estriol tripropionate =

Chemical compound

Clinical data
- Trade names: Estriel
- Other names: Oestriol tripropionate; Estriol tripropanoate
- Routes of administration: Intramuscular injection
- Drug class: Estrogen; Estrogen ester

Identifiers
- IUPAC name: [(8R,9S,13S,14S,16R,17R)-13-methyl-3,17-di(propanoyloxy)-6,7,8,9,11,12,14,15,16,17-decahydrocyclopenta[a]phenanthren-16-yl] propanoate
- CAS Number: 2236-31-9
- PubChem CID: 102232
- DrugBank: DB14641
- ChemSpider: 92362
- UNII: S2A0P1AFQ9
- CompTox Dashboard (EPA): DTXSID4057689
- ECHA InfoCard: 100.017.090

Chemical and physical data
- Formula: C_{27}H_{36}O_{6}
- Molar mass: 456.579 g·mol^{−1}
- 3D model (JSmol): Interactive image
- SMILES: CCC(=O)O[C@@H]1C[C@H]2[C@@H]3CCc4cc(OC(=O)CC)ccc4[C@H]3CC[C@]2(C)[C@H]1OC(=O)CC
- InChI: InChI=1S/C27H36O6/c1-5-23(28)31-17-9-11-18-16(14-17)8-10-20-19(18)12-13-27(4)21(20)15-22(32-24(29)6-2)26(27)33-25(30)7-3/h9,11,14,19-22,26H,5-8,10,12-13,15H2,1-4H3/t19-,20-,21+,22-,26+,27+/m1/s1; Key:ONMZMZJEZHMWQL-REUUDLSRSA-N

Estriol tripropionate (brand name Estriel), or estriol tripropanoate, is an estrogen medication. It is an estrogen ester, specifically, an ester of estriol.

== See also ==
- List of estrogen esters § Estriol esters
