= 16-alpha-hydroxysteroid dehydrogenase =

Class of enzymes

Identifiers
- EC no.: 1.1.1.147
- CAS no.: 37250-74-1

Databases
- IntEnz: IntEnz view
- BRENDA: BRENDA entry
- ExPASy: NiceZyme view
- KEGG: KEGG entry
- MetaCyc: metabolic pathway
- PRIAM: profile
- PDB structures: RCSB PDB PDBe PDBsum
- Gene Ontology: AmiGO / QuickGO
Search
- PMC: articles
- PubMed: articles
- NCBI: proteins

In enzymology, a 16alpha-hydroxysteroid dehydrogenase (EC 1.1.1.147) is an enzyme that catalyzes the chemical reaction

a 16alpha-hydroxysteroid + NAD(P)^{+} $\rightleftharpoons$ a 16-oxosteroid + NAD(P)H + H^{+}

The 3 substrates of this enzyme are 16alpha-hydroxysteroid, NAD^{+}, and NADP^{+}, whereas its 4 products are 16-oxosteroid, NADH, NADPH, and H^{+}.

This enzyme belongs to the family of oxidoreductases, specifically those acting on the CH-OH group of donor with NAD^{+} or NADP^{+} as acceptor. The systematic name of this enzyme class is 16alpha-hydroxysteroid:NAD(P)^{+} 16-oxidoreductase. This enzyme is also called 16alpha-hydroxy steroid dehydrogenase.
