= Dimethylstilbestrol =

Chemical compound

Clinical data
- Other names: DMS; (Ε)-α,α'-Dimethyl-4,4'-stilbenediol
- Drug class: Nonsteroidal estrogen

Identifiers
- IUPAC name: 4-[(E)-3-(4-Hydroxyphenyl)but-2-en-2-yl]phenol
- CAS Number: 552-80-7 13366-36-4
- PubChem CID: 3004636
- ChemSpider: 2274931
- UNII: 30L22Q8N9M
- KEGG: C14234
- ChEBI: CHEBI:34717
- ChEMBL: ChEMBL269003
- CompTox Dashboard (EPA): DTXSID2022468

Chemical and physical data
- Formula: C_{16}H_{16}O_{2}
- Molar mass: 240.302 g·mol^{−1}
- 3D model (JSmol): Interactive image
- SMILES: C/C(=C(/C)\C1=CC=C(C=C1)O)/C2=CC=C(C=C2)O
- InChI: InChI=1S/C16H16O2/c1-11(13-3-7-15(17)8-4-13)12(2)14-5-9-16(18)10-6-14/h3-10,17-18H,1-2H3/b12-11+; Key:XPINIPXARSNZDM-VAWYXSNFSA-N

Dimethylstilbestrol (DMS) is a nonsteroidal estrogen of the stilbestrol group related to diethylstilbestrol which was never marketed. It is a so-called "weak", "impeded", or "short-acting" estrogen similarly to estriol and meso-butoestrol. The affinity of DMS for the ER was reported as about 10% of that of estradiol. For comparison, diethylstilbestrol had 140% of the affinity of estradiol for the ER.

The endometrial proliferation dose of DMS in women is 20 mg. A single 12 mg intramuscular injection of DMS has a duration of approximately 12 days in humans.

== Synthesis ==
The synthesis begins with the reaction of diacetyl with phenol to yield 2,2-bis(p-hydroxy-m-toluyl)-3-butanone. Pinacol rearrangement then produces the corresponding stilbenoid.

If m-cresol is used as a starting material instead of phenol, the resulting product has a potency 0.5 times the potency of diethylstilbestrol.

In the newer version of the synthesis, a McMurry reaction (homodimerization) between on acetanisole and the appropriate choice of a reagent will yield 1,1'-(but-2-ene-2,3-diyl)bis(4-methoxybenzene). Demethylation of the two ethers then concludes the synthesis.
