= 16β-Hydroxyestrone =

Names
- IUPAC name 3,16β-Dihydroxyestra-1,3,5(10)-trien-17-one
- Systematic IUPAC name (2S,3aS,3bR,9bS,11aS)-2,7-Dihydroxy-11a-methyl-2,3,3a,3b,4,5,9b,10,11,11a-decahydro-1H-cyclopenta[a]phenanthren-1-one
- Other names 16β-OH-E1

Identifiers
| CAS Number | 966-06-3 |
| 3D model (JSmol) | Interactive image |
| ChEBI | CHEBI:87628 |
| ChEMBL | ChEMBL1908079 |
| ChemSpider | 17215934 |
| PubChem CID | 22833517 |
| CompTox Dashboard (EPA) | DTXSID301316033 |
- InChI: InChI=1S/C18H22O3/c1-18-7-6-13-12-5-3-11(19)8-10(12)2-4-14(13)15(18)9-16(20)17(18)21/h3,5,8,13-16,19-20H,2,4,6-7,9H2,1H3/t13-,14-,15+,16+,18+/m1/s1 Key: WPOCIZJTELRQMF-LFRCEIEQSA-N
- SMILES: Oc1ccc2[C@H]3CC[C@]4(C)C([C@]6C[C@H]4[C@@H]3CCc2c1)=O.O6

Properties
| Chemical formula | C_{18}H_{22}O_{3} |
| Molar mass | 286.371 g·mol^{−1} |
- Except where otherwise noted, data are given for materials in their standard state (at 25 °C [77 °F], 100 kPa). Infobox references

16β-Hydroxyestrone (16β-OH-E1) is an endogenous estrogen which serves as a metabolite of estrone as well as a metabolic intermediate in the transformation of estrone into epiestriol (16β-hydroxyestradiol). 16β-Hydroxyestrone has similar estrogenic activity to that of 16α-hydroxyestrone. It is less potent than estradiol or estrone but can produce similar maximal uterotrophy at sufficiently high doses, suggesting a fully estrogenic profile.

== See also ==
- 16-Ketoestrone
