= Ethinylestriol =

Chemical compound

Clinical data
- Other names: EE3; 17α-Ethynylestriol; 17α-Ethynylestra-1,3,5(10)-triene-3,16α,17β-triol
- Routes of administration: By mouth
- Drug class: Estrogen

Identifiers
- IUPAC name: (8R,9S,13S,14S,16R,17R)-17-ethynyl-13-methyl-7,8,9,11,12,14,15,16-octahydro-6H-cyclopenta[a]phenanthrene-3,16,17-triol
- CAS Number: 4717-40-2
- PubChem CID: 11723045
- ChemSpider: 9897761
- UNII: PVH6K749AL
- ChEMBL: ChEMBL1627607

Chemical and physical data
- Formula: C_{20}H_{24}O_{3}
- Molar mass: 312.409 g·mol^{−1}
- 3D model (JSmol): Interactive image
- SMILES: C[C@]12CC[C@H]3[C@H]([C@@H]1C[C@H]([C@]2(C#C)O)O)CCC4=C3C=CC(=C4)O
- InChI: InChI=1S/C20H24O3/c1-3-20(23)18(22)11-17-16-6-4-12-10-13(21)5-7-14(12)15(16)8-9-19(17,20)2/h1,5,7,10,15-18,21-23H,4,6,8-9,11H2,2H3/t15-,16-,17+,18-,19+,20+/m1/s1; Key:VSODIPLKPBLGCC-NADOGSGZSA-N

Ethinylestriol (EE3), or 17α-ethynylestriol, also known as 17α-ethynylestra-1,3,5(10)-triene-3,16α,17β-triol, is a synthetic estrogen which was never marketed. Nilestriol, the 3-cyclopentyl ether of ethinylestriol, is a prodrug of ethinylestriol, and is a more potent estrogen in comparison, but, in contrast to ethinylestriol, has been marketed. Ethinylestriol has been found to reduce the risk of 7,12-dimethylbenz(a)anthracene (DMBA)-induced mammary cancer when given as a prophylactic in animal models, while other estrogens like ethinylestradiol and diethylstilbestrol were ineffective.

== See also ==
- List of estrogens
