= Meso-Butestrol =

Chemical compound

meso-Butestrol
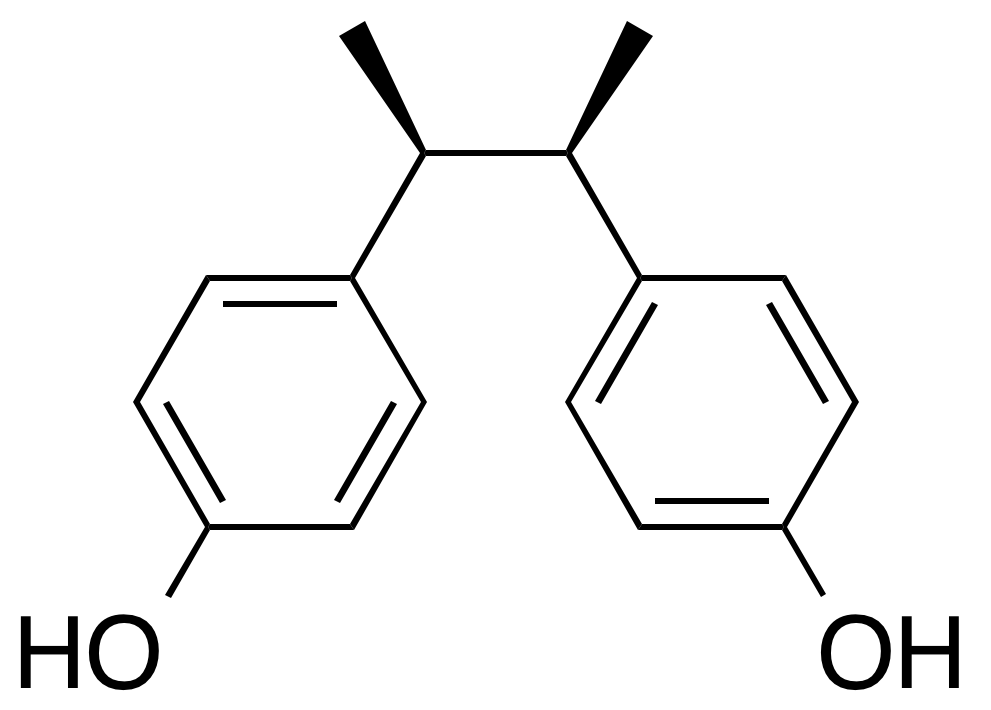

Clinical data
- Other names: meso-Butoestrol; SC-3402; mbE_{3}; meso-2,3-bis(4-Hydroxyphenyl)-n-butane
- Drug class: Nonsteroidal estrogen

Identifiers
- IUPAC name: 4-[(2S,3R)-3-(4-hydroxyphenyl)butan-2-yl]phenol
- CAS Number: 2962-14-3
- PubChem CID: 200945
- ChemSpider: 173970
- UNII: PQ4GVS4T9S
- ChEMBL: ChEMBL326340
- CompTox Dashboard (EPA): DTXSID00183802

Chemical and physical data
- Formula: C_{16}H_{18}O_{2}
- Molar mass: 242.318 g·mol^{−1}
- 3D model (JSmol): Interactive image
- SMILES: C[C@H](C1=CC=C(C=C1)O)[C@@H](C)C2=CC=C(C=C2)O
- InChI: InChI=1S/C16H18O2/c1-11(13-3-7-15(17)8-4-13)12(2)14-5-9-16(18)10-6-14/h3-12,17-18H,1-2H3/t11-,12+; Key:GDUYFVYTXYOMSJ-TXEJJXNPSA-N

meso-Butestrol (developmental code name SC-3402), also known as 2,3-bis(4-hydroxyphenyl)butane, is a synthetic nonsteroidal estrogen which was never marketed. It is a so-called "short-acting" or "impeded" estrogen. meso-Butestrol is structurally related to diethylstilbestrol and other stilbestrols. The fully potent counterpart to meso-butestrol is meso-hexestrol, analogously to the relationship of dimethylstilbestrol to diethylstilbestrol.

== See also ==
- Butestrol
