= Estriol dipropionate =

Chemical compound

Clinical data
- Other names: Oestriol dipropionate; Estriol 3,17β-dipropionate; 16α-Hydroxyestra-1,3,5(10)-triene-3,17β-diyl dipropanoate
- Routes of administration: Intramuscular injection
- Drug class: Estrogen; Estrogen ester

Identifiers
- IUPAC name: [(8R,9S,13S,14S,16R,17R)-16-hydroxy-13-methyl-3-propanoyloxy-6,7,8,9,11,12,14,15,16,17-decahydrocyclopenta[a]phenanthren-17-yl] propanoate
- CAS Number: 104202-88-2
- PubChem CID: 128508
- ChemSpider: 113905
- UNII: AYW6G49M3S

Chemical and physical data
- Formula: C_{24}H_{32}O_{5}
- Molar mass: 400.515 g·mol^{−1}
- 3D model (JSmol): Interactive image
- SMILES: CCC(=O)O[C@H]1[C@@H](C[C@@H]2[C@@]1(CC[C@H]3[C@H]2CCC4=C3C=CC(=C4)OC(=O)CC)C)O
- InChI: InChI=1S/C24H32O5/c1-4-21(26)28-15-7-9-16-14(12-15)6-8-18-17(16)10-11-24(3)19(18)13-20(25)23(24)29-22(27)5-2/h7,9,12,17-20,23,25H,4-6,8,10-11,13H2,1-3H3/t17-,18-,19+,20-,23+,24+/m1/s1; Key:QKLDCEYHDKPVDK-PRIYMHJNSA-N

Estriol dipropionate, or estriol 3,17β-dipropionate, is a synthetic estrogen and estrogen ester – specifically, the C3 and C17β dipropionate ester of estriol – which was first described in 1963 and was never marketed. Following a single intramuscular injection of 6.94 mg estriol dipropionate (equivalent to 5.0 mg estriol) in an oil solution, peak levels of estriol occurred after 0.83 days, an elimination half-life of 12.7 hours was observed, and estriol levels remained elevated for up to 4 days. For comparison, the duration of estriol was much shorter, while that of estriol dihexanoate was much longer.

== See also ==
- List of estrogen esters § Estriol esters
