= Estriol 3-glucuronide =

Chemical compound

Names
- IUPAC name 16α,17β-Dihydroxyestra-1,3,5(10)-trien-3-yl β-D-glucopyranosiduronic acid
- Systematic IUPAC name (2S,3S,4S,5R,6S)-6-{[(1R,2R,3aS,3bR,9bS,11aS)-1,2-Dihydroxy-11a-methyl-2,3,3a,3b,4,5,9b,10,11,11a-decahydro-1H-cyclopenta[a]phenanthren-7-yl]oxy}-3,4,5-trihydroxyoxane-2-carboxylic acid
- Other names (16α,17β)-16,17-Dihydroxyestra-1(10),2,4-trien-3-yl β-D-glucopyranosiduronic acid

Identifiers
CAS Number	2479-91-6
3D model (JSmol)	Interactive image
ChEBI	CHEBI:45869
ChEMBL	ChEMBL1236070
ChemSpider	391387
KEGG	C11288
PubChem CID	443103
CompTox Dashboard (EPA)	DTXSID60947700
- InChI: InChI=1S/C24H32O9/c1-24-7-6-13-12-5-3-11(32-23-19(28)17(26)18(27)20(33-23)22(30)31)8-10(12)2-4-14(13)15(24)9-16(25)21(24)29/h3,5,8,13-21,23,25-29H,2,4,6-7,9H2,1H3,(H,30,31)/t13-,14-,15+,16-,17+,18+,19-,20+,21+,23-,24+/m1/s1 Key: UZKIAJMSMKLBQE-JRSYHJKYSA-N; InChI=1/C24H32O9/c1-24-7-6-13-12-5-3-11(32-23-19(28)17(26)18(27)20(33-23)22(30)31)8-10(12)2-4-14(13)15(24)9-16(25)21(24)29/h3,5,8,13-21,23,25-29H,2,4,6-7,9H2,1H3,(H,30,31)/t13-,14-,15+,16-,17+,18+,19-,20+,21+,23-,24+/m1/s1 Key: UZKIAJMSMKLBQE-JRSYHJKYBO
- SMILES: C[C@]12CC[C@@H]3c4ccc(cc4CC[C@H]3[C@@H]1C[C@H]([C@@H]2O)O)O[C@H]5[C@@H]([C@H]([C@@H]([C@H](O5)C(=O)O)O)O)O

Properties
Chemical formula	C_{24}H_{32}O_{9}
Molar mass	464.511 g·mol^{−1}
- Except where otherwise noted, data are given for materials in their standard state (at 25 °C [77 °F], 100 kPa). Infobox references

Estriol 3-glucuronide, or oestriol 3-glucuronide, also known as estriol 3-β-D-glucosiduronic acid, is a natural, steroidal estrogen and a glucuronic acid (β-D-glucopyranuronic acid) conjugate of estriol. It is found in the urine of women as a reversibly formed metabolite of estriol. The positional isomer of estriol 3-glucuronide, estriol 16α-glucuronide, also occurs as an endogenous metabolite of estriol, but to a much greater extent in comparison.

== Formation ==
A glucuronosyltransferase anzyme converts estriol to its glucuronide by adding a sugar acid at the phenolic hydroxy group, with uridine diphosphate (UDP) as byproduct:

estriol
+ UDP-glucuronate
UDP
estriol 3-glucuronide

== See also ==
- Estrogen conjugate
- Estradiol glucuronide
- Estrone glucuronide
- Estradiol sulfate
- Estrone sulfate
- Lipoidal estradiol
- Catechol estrogen
