= Estriol triacetate =

Chemical compound

Clinical data
- Other names: Oestriol triacetate; Estra-1,3,5(10)-triene-3,16α,17β-triol 3,16α,17β-triacetate
- Drug class: Estrogen; Estrogen ester

Identifiers
- IUPAC name: [(8R,9S,13S,14S,16R,17R)-3,17-Diacetyloxy-13-methyl-6,7,8,9,11,12,14,15,16,17-decahydrocyclopenta[a]phenanthren-16-yl] acetate
- CAS Number: 2284-32-4
- PubChem CID: 15125811
- ChemSpider: 19954661
- UNII: Y14M23K44M
- CompTox Dashboard (EPA): DTXSID90945537
- ECHA InfoCard: 100.164.376

Chemical and physical data
- Formula: C_{24}H_{30}O_{6}
- Molar mass: 414.498 g·mol^{−1}
- 3D model (JSmol): Interactive image
- SMILES: CC(=O)O[C@@H]1C[C@H]2[C@@H]3CCC4=C([C@H]3CC[C@@]2([C@H]1OC(=O)C)C)C=CC(=C4)OC(=O)C
- InChI: InChI=1S/C24H30O6/c1-13(25)28-17-6-8-18-16(11-17)5-7-20-19(18)9-10-24(4)21(20)12-22(29-14(2)26)23(24)30-15(3)27/h6,8,11,19-23H,5,7,9-10,12H2,1-4H3/t19-,20-,21+,22-,23+,24+/m1/s1; Key:DKZPDNPWKHTWCC-YYTJJFCCSA-N

Estriol triacetate is an estrogen medication and an estrogen ester – specifically, the triacetate ester of estriol – which was never marketed. It has been said to be 10 times as physiologically active as estriol.

== See also ==
- List of estrogen esters § Estriol esters
