= Plicatin =

Plicatin refers to two kinds of hydroxycinnamic acid.

- Plicatin A
- Plicatin B
