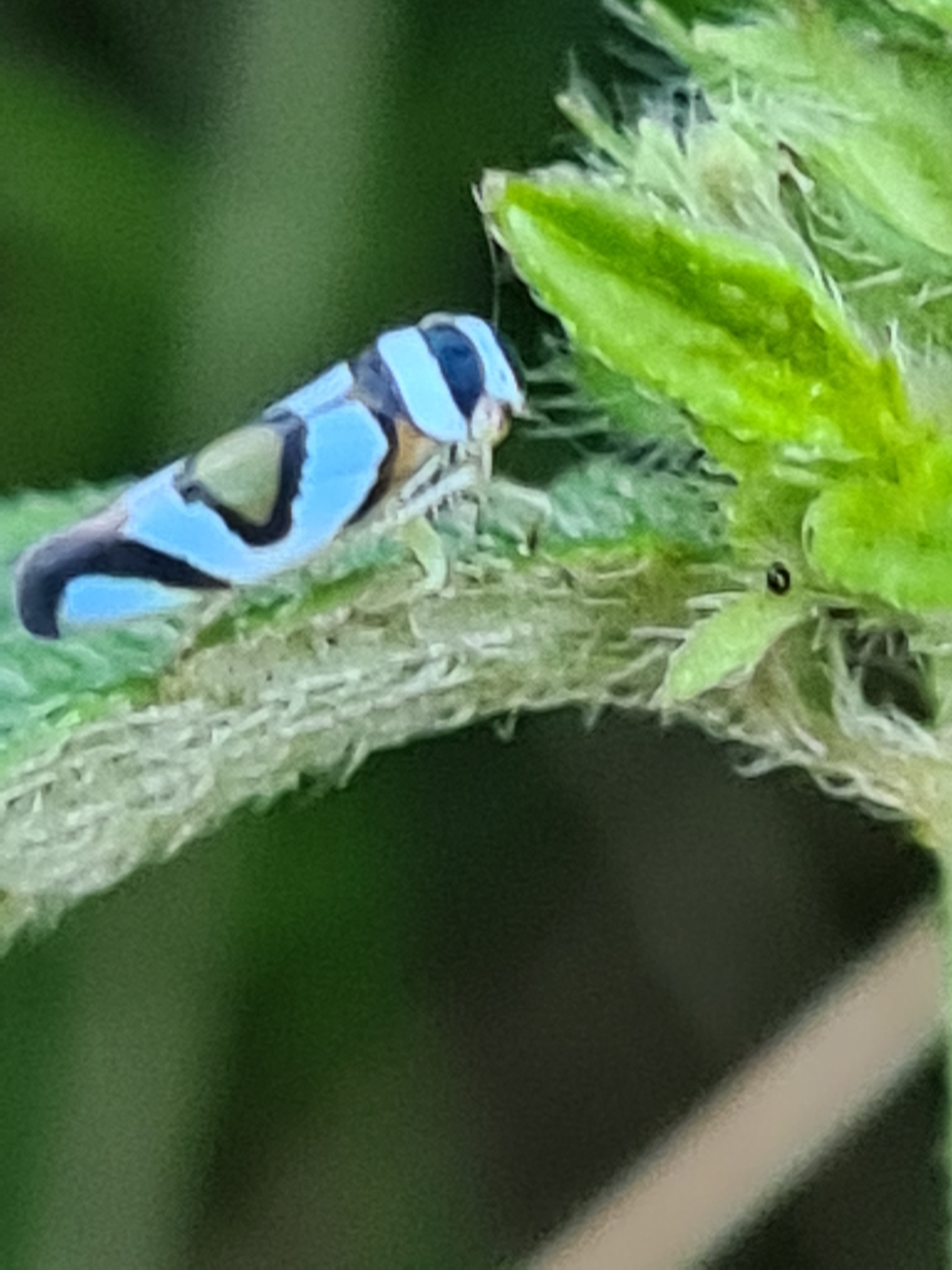

Scientific classification
- Domain: Eukaryota
- Kingdom: Animalia
- Phylum: Arthropoda
- Class: Insecta
- Order: Hemiptera
- Suborder: Auchenorrhyncha
- Family: Cicadellidae
- Genus: Macugonalia
- Species: M. moesta

Binomial name
- Macugonalia moesta (Fabricius, 1803)

= Macugonalia moesta =

Species of insect

Macugonalia moesta is a species of leafhopper from the genus Macugonalia. The species was originally described by Johan Christian Fabricius in 1803.

== Description ==
Macugonalia moesta is a small blue insect that is 6,7 millimeters long. It has two spots on its back that look like a blue band in the middle and black on the sides. The head and the middle part of the body, the thorax, are black. On the thorax, there is a blue band that stops near the insect's compound eyes. On the head, there is a white band between the eyes that covers two small eyes called ocelli.

== Hosts ==
Macugonalia moesta has been found on Wedelia trilobata, Ayapana pallustrus, Heliotropium indicum, Ocimum basilicum, Hyptis mutabilis and Aristolochia iquitensis.

== Distribution ==
Macugonalia moesta has been documented in Brazil, French Guiana, Guyana, Peru, and Suriname. Recent observations obtained through crowdsourcing seem to confirm this.

== Ecology ==
Together with Macugonalia umbrosa, M. moesta has been observed as possible vectors for Xylella fastidiosa in citrus orchards in Brazil. X. fastidiosa is a xylem-inhabiting, vector-transmitted, Gram-negative, very slow-growing bacterium, which in the Amazon causes citrus variegated chlorosis (CVC) or citrus X disease.
