= Eclipta =

- Eclipta (beetle), a genus of insects in the family Cerambycidae
- Eclipta (plant), a genus of plants in the family Asteraceae
