= C16H10O7 =

The molecular formula C_{16}H_{10}O_{7} may refer to:

- Laccaic acid
- Parietinic acid
- Wedelolactone
