= E. erecta =

E. erecta may refer to:

- Ehrharta erecta, the panic veldtgrass, a grass species native to Southern Africa and Yemen
- Eclipta erecta, a synonym for Eclipta alba

== See also ==
- Erecta
