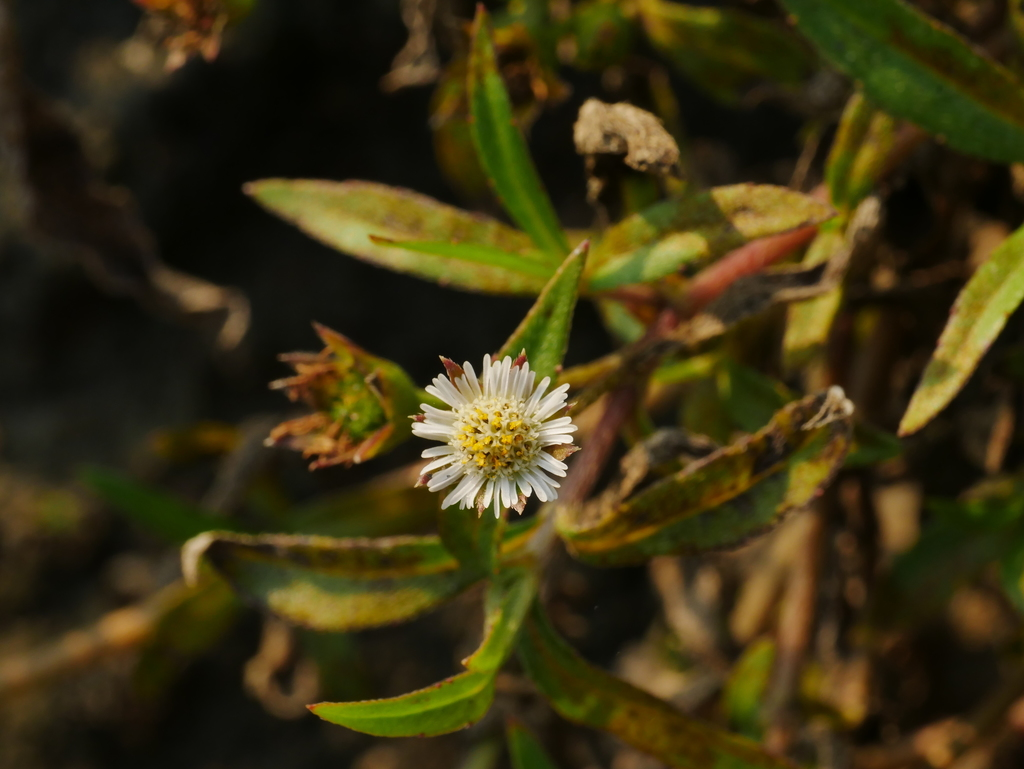

Conservation status
- Least Concern (IUCN 3.1)

Scientific classification
- Kingdom: Plantae
- Clade: Tracheophytes
- Clade: Angiosperms
- Clade: Eudicots
- Clade: Asterids
- Order: Asterales
- Family: Asteraceae
- Tribe: Heliantheae
- Genus: Eclipta
- Species: E. angustata

Binomial name
- Eclipta angustata Umemoto & Koyama

= Eclipta angustata =

Species of flowering plant

Eclipta angustata is an Asian species of plants in the family Asteraceae. It is widespread across the Indian subcontinent, Southeast Asia, southern China, Taiwan, and the Ryukyu Islands in Japan. It is regarded as a weed in some places, in others used as an herb, hair dye, or edible vegetable.

Eclipta angustata was for years regarded as part of the species E. prostrata before being recognized as a distinct species in 2007. It differs in having sessile leaves, subovate achenes, and conspicuous tubercules.
