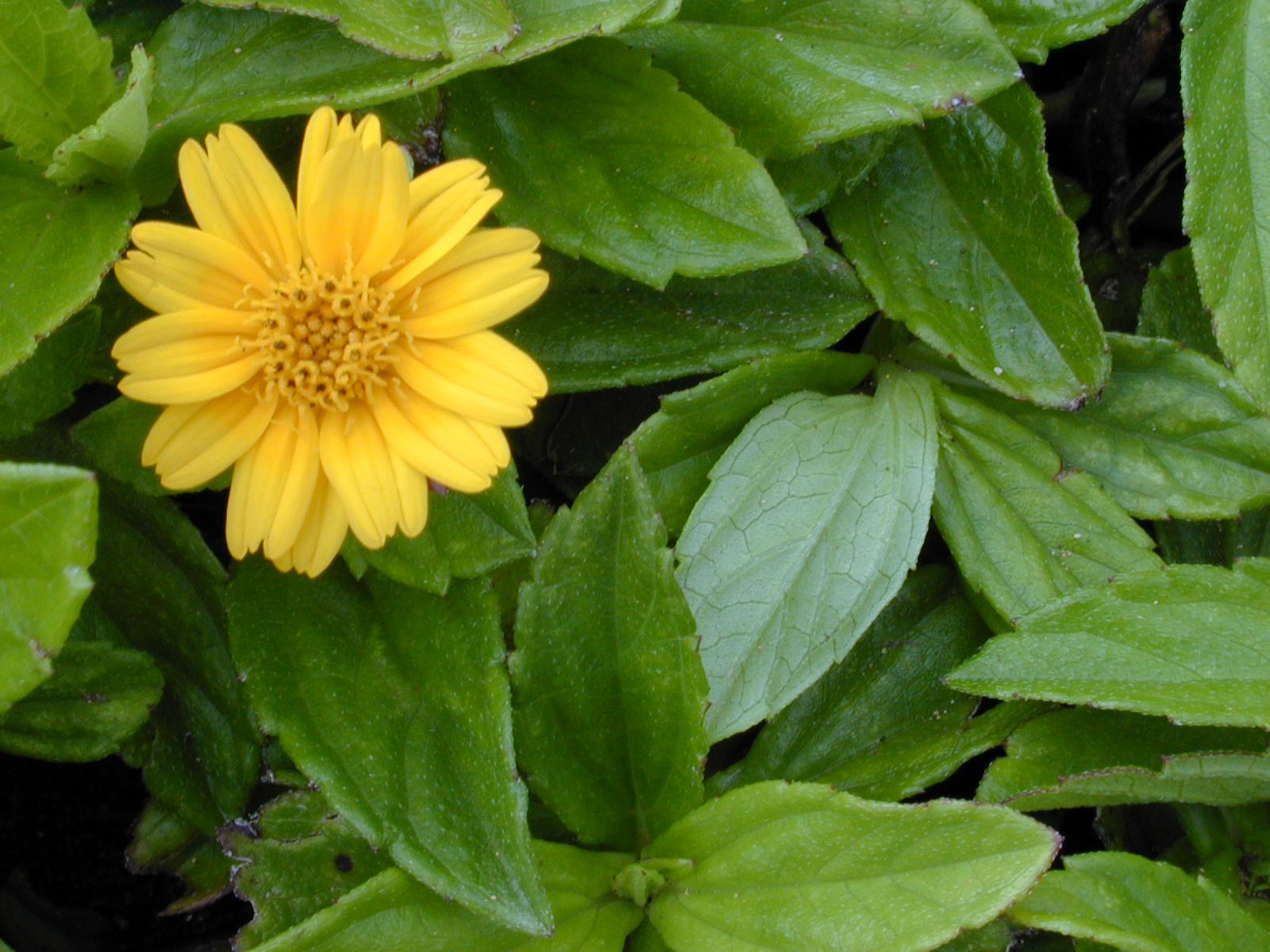
- Sphagneticola trilobata

Scientific classification
- Kingdom: Plantae
- Clade: Tracheophytes
- Clade: Angiosperms
- Clade: Eudicots
- Clade: Asterids
- Order: Asterales
- Family: Asteraceae
- Subfamily: Asteroideae
- Tribe: Heliantheae
- Subtribe: Ecliptinae
- Genus: Sphagneticola; O.Hoffm.

Type species
- Sphagneticola ulei O.Hoffm.

Synonyms
- Complaya Strother; Thelechitonia Cuatrec.; Wedelia sect. Stemmodon Griseb.

= Sphagneticola =

Genus of plants

Sphagneticola is a genus of flowering plants in the family Asteraceae. Creeping-oxeye is a common name for plants in this genus.

Species

- Sphagneticola brachycarpa (Baker) Pruski - Guyana, Venezuela, Brazil, Paraguay, Argentina, Peru, Bolivia
- Sphagneticola calendulacea (L.) Pruski - China, Japan, India, Sri Lanka, Indochina, Indonesia, Philippines
- Sphagneticola gracilis (Rich.) Pruski - Puerto Rico, Cuba, Hispaniola, Jamaica, Antigua
- Sphagneticola trilobata (L.) Pruski - native to South America, widely naturalized in many subtropical and tropical regions (Asia, Australia, Pacific Islands, Mesoamerica, West Indies, Florida, Louisiana etc.)
- Sphagneticola ulei O.Hoffm. - native to the American tropics
