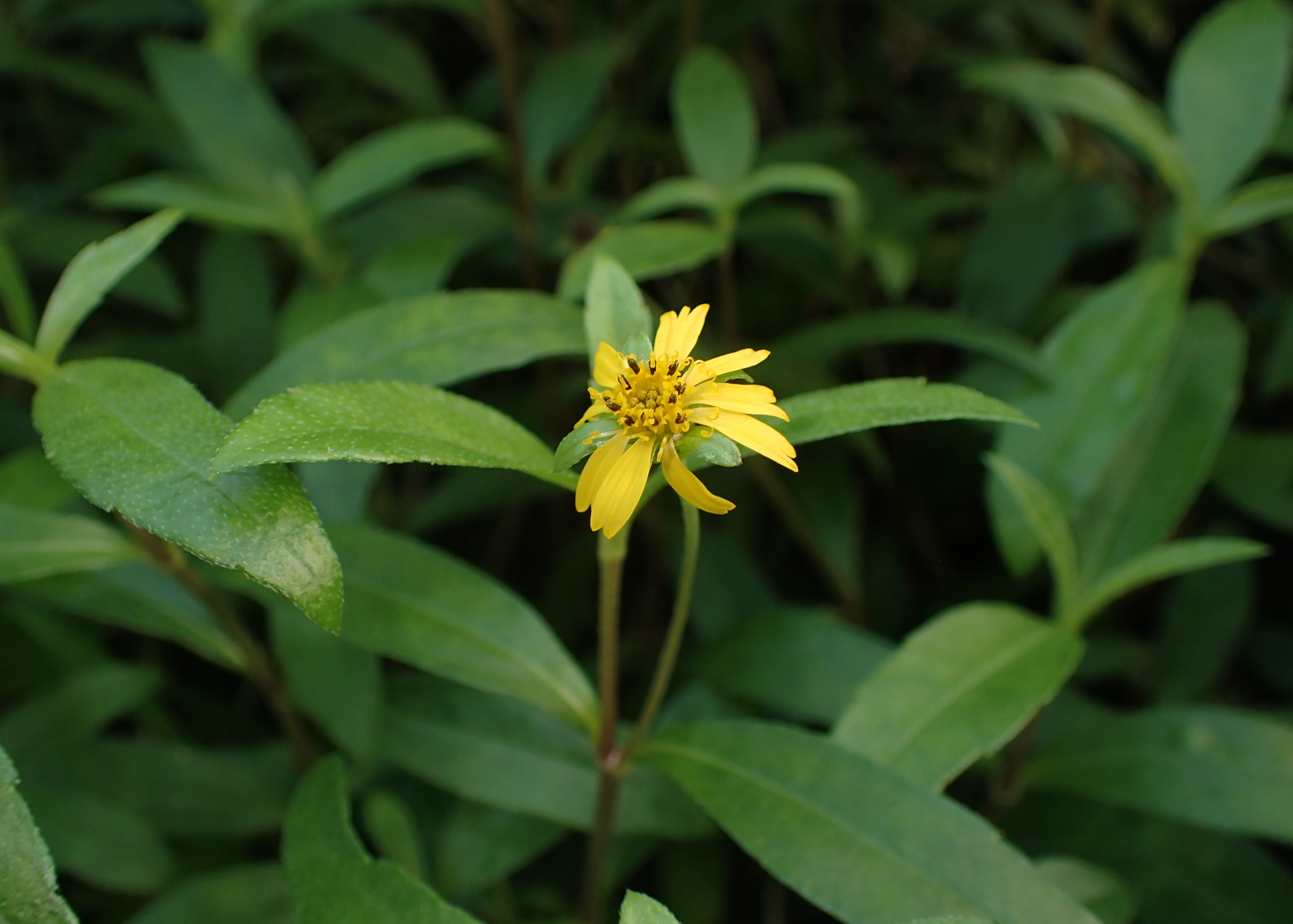

Scientific classification
- Kingdom: Plantae
- Clade: Tracheophytes
- Clade: Angiosperms
- Clade: Eudicots
- Clade: Asterids
- Order: Asterales
- Family: Asteraceae
- Tribe: Heliantheae
- Genus: Sphagneticola
- Species: S. calendulacea

Binomial name
- Sphagneticola calendulacea (L.) Pruski

Synonyms
- Verbesina calendulacea L.; Wedelia chinensis (Osbeck) Merr.

= Sphagneticola calendulacea =

Species of plant

Sphagneticola calendulacea is a perennial herb in the genus Sphagneticola. It is found in China, India, Indonesia, Japan, Myanmar, Philippines, Sri Lanka, Thailand, Taiwan, Bangladesh and Vietnam. Tolerant to drought, humidity and barren environment, S. calendulacea is a common herbaceous plant in China and Taiwan. S. calendulacea produces wedelolactone and demethylwedelolactone.

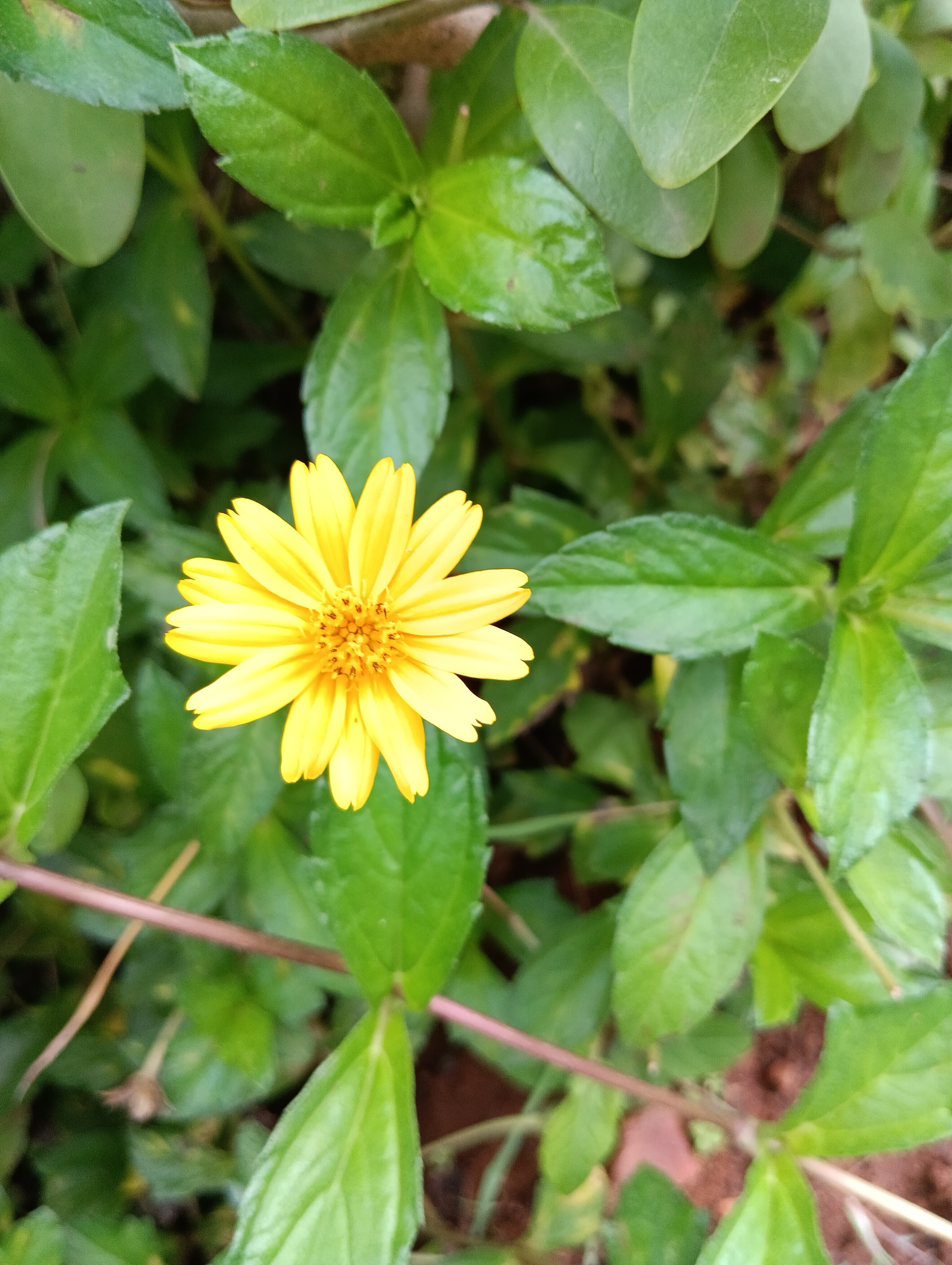
Bloomed Wedelia chinensis

In Vietnam, the leaves of the plant is sometimes used to treat infant eczema although scientific evidence is not clear.

In China and Taiwan, S. calendulacea is an ingredient in 青草茶/百草茶(a kind of herbal tea). 青草茶 is a natural drink that has been around for a long time. In traditional Chinese medicine, S. calendulacea is classified as "清熱藥/Heat-clearing herbs". It has the effect of relieve fever and detoxification, cooling blood and dissipating blood stasis. According to modern scientific research, polyphenols such as Wedelolactone, Apigenin and Luteolin contained in S. calendulacea can inhibit the growth of prostate cancer, breast cancer and nasopharyngeal carcinoma. A paper from India states that the essential oil of S. calendulacea can prevent the development of lung cancer.(2012)
