= Cullen plicatum =

Scientific classification
- Kingdom: Plantae
- Clade: Embryophytes
- Clade: Tracheophytes
- Clade: Spermatophytes
- Clade: Angiosperms
- Clade: Eudicots
- Clade: Rosids
- Order: Fabales
- Family: Fabaceae
- Subfamily: Faboideae
- Genus: Cullen
- Species: C. plicatum

Binomial name
- Cullen plicatum (Delile) C.H.Stirt.

Synonyms
- Lotodes plicatum (Delile) Kuntze; Munbya plicata (Delile) Pomel; Psoralea obovata Roxb.; Psoralea odorata Blatt. & Hallb.; Psoralea plicata Delile

Species of legume

Cullen plicatum, synonym Psoralea plicata, is a herb species in the genus Psoralea. It is native from northern Africa to north-west India and to South Africa.

C. plicatum contains plicadin, a coumestan, and plicatin A and B, two hydroxycinnamic acids.
