= Coumestrol =

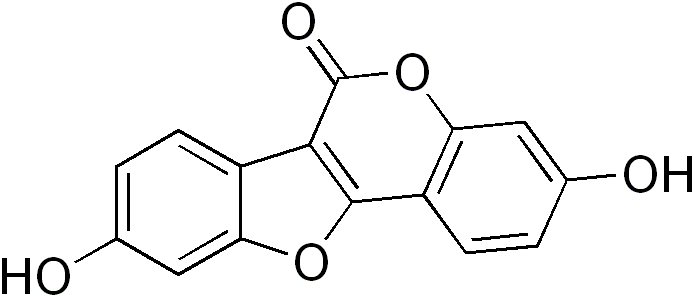

Names
- IUPAC name 3,9-Dihydroxypterocarp-6a(11a)-en-6-one
- Systematic IUPAC name 3,9-Dihydroxy-6H-[1]benzofuro[3,2-c][1]benzopyran-6-one

Identifiers
CAS Number	479-13-0
3D model (JSmol)	Interactive image; Interactive image
ChEBI	CHEBI:3908
ChEMBL	ChEMBL30707
ChemSpider	4445024
ECHA InfoCard	100.006.842
EC Number	207-525-6
KEGG	C10205
PubChem CID	5281707
UNII	V7NW98OB34
CompTox Dashboard (EPA)	DTXSID6022399
- InChI: InChI=1S/C15H8O5/c16-7-1-3-9-11(5-7)19-14-10-4-2-8(17)6-12(10)20-15(18)13(9)14/h1-6,16-17H Key: ZZIALNLLNHEQPJ-UHFFFAOYSA-N; InChI=1/C15H8O5/c16-7-1-3-9-11(5-7)19-14-10-4-2-8(17)6-12(10)20-15(18)13(9)14/h1-6,16-17H Key: ZZIALNLLNHEQPJ-UHFFFAOYAN
- SMILES: C1=CC2=C(C=C1O)OC3=C2C(=O)OC4=C3C=CC(=C4)O; O=C3Oc4cc(O)ccc4c2oc1c(ccc(O)c1)c23

Properties
Chemical formula	C_{15}H_{8}O_{5}
Molar mass	268.224 g·mol^{−1}
Melting point	385 °C (725 °F; 658 K) (decomposes)
- Except where otherwise noted, data are given for materials in their standard state (at 25 °C [77 °F], 100 kPa). verify (what is ?) Infobox references

Coumestrol is a natural organic compound in the class of phytochemicals known as coumestans. Coumestrol was first identified as a compound with estrogenic properties by E. M. Bickoff in ladino clover and alfalfa in 1957. It has garnered research interest because of its estrogenic activity and prevalence in some foods, including soybeans, brussels sprouts, spinach and a variety of legumes. The highest concentrations of coumestrol are found in clover, Kala Chana (a type of chick pea), and Alfalfa sprouts.

Coumestrol is a phytoestrogen, mimicking the biological activity of estrogens. Phytoestrogens are able to pass through cell membranes due to their low molecular weight and stable structure, and they are able to interact with the enzymes and receptors of cells. Coumestrol binds to the ERα and ERβ with similar affinity to that of estradiol (94% and 185% of the relative binding affinity of estradiol at the ERα and ERβ, respectively), although the estrogenic activity of coumestrol at both receptors is much less than that of estradiol. In any case, coumestrol has estrogenic activity that is 30 to 100 times greater than that of isoflavones.

The chemical shape of coumestrol orients its two hydroxy groups in the same position as the two hydroxy groups in estradiol, allowing it to inhibit the activity of aromatase and 3α-hydroxysteroid dehydrogenase. These enzymes are involved in the biosynthesis of steroid hormones, and inhibition of these enzymes results in interference with hormone metabolism.

== Natural sources and dietary intake ==
Levels of coumestrol within individual plants of the same species are variable. Studies of coumestrol levels in alfalfa suggest that there may be a positive correlation between coumestrol production and infection of the plant by viruses, bacteria, and fungi. Higher levels of coumestrol are also found in plants which had been damaged by aphids. Further study is required to fully explain the cause of the correlation between damage, infection, and coumestrol levels.

According to the United States Department of Agriculture and Iowa State University database on isoflavanes and coumestrol, coumestrol is found in the following food items:

Food Item	Coumestrol Level (mg/100g)
Large, dry Lima beans	0.14
Raw Pinto Beans	1.80
Dry Kala Chana	6.13
Alfalfa Sprouts	1.60
Raw Clover Sprouts	14.08
Soy Sprouts	0.34
Mature Soy Beans	0.02
Unfortified Original and Vanilla Soy milk	0.81
Fortified Original and Vanilla Soy milk	0.12
Firm Tofu Prepared with Calcium Sulfate and Magnesium Chloride	0.12
Doughnuts with Soy Flour of Protein	0.24

Based on extrapolation from studies done on animals, the maximum tolerable daily intake of coumestrol for human beings has been estimated at 22 μg per kg of body mass. This was calculated by extrapolating from the lowest level at which adverse effects were seen in animals. Although due to the variability of the human diet, the exact amount of coumestrol the average person consumes has not been calculated, studies of phytoestrogen intake suggest that most human diets result in a negligible intake of coumestrol relative to the maximum tolerable daily intake.

== Biological effects on mammals ==
Because coumestrol is an estrogen mimic, it is an endocrine disruptor with the potential to affect all organ systems that are regulated hormonally via estrogens.

=== Nervous system ===
Coumestrol and other phytoestrogens have been shown to have an effect on sexual behavior in rats by antagonizing the action of estrogen within the brain; male rats that nursed from females with coumestrol in their diets were both less likely to mount a female rat and less likely to ejaculate, despite producing normal levels of testosterone. Exposure produced similar decreases of sexual behavior in female rats, as a result of the disruption of estrogen dependent gene expression in the brain. Effects were seen in three areas of the hypothalamus, the ventromedial nucleus, the paraventricular nucleus, and the medial preoptic area, all of which play a role in sexual behavior and sexual activity. Female rats that were exposed to coumestrol neonatally did not adopt the lordosis position as much as those that were not exposed to coumestrol.

=== Reproductive system ===
Coumestrol has been shown to accelerate the onset of puberty in mice. Exposure to coumestrol immediately after birth resulted in an initial increase in uterine weight. However, continued exposure inhibited the growth of the uterus and decreased levels of estrogen receptors within uterine tissue. The rats also showed altered vaginal development including cornification and metaplasia of vaginal tissue, and delayed opening of the vagina. When neonatal female mice were treated with coumestrol, similar reproductive irregularities occurred, and at 22 months old, atypical collagen distribution was observed in the uterine wall. When 2 day old male Wistar rats are injected with coumestrol daily, they exhibit a decrease in size in the lumens of their seminiferous tubules and germ cells go through increased rates of apoptosis. When bulls graze on pastures containing coumestrol, metaplasia occurs in the prostate and bulbourethral glands, and sperm maturation is suppressed. Female cows that consumed alfalfa experienced lower pregnancy rates and spontaneous abortions, as well as abnormal estrogen levels during pregnancy. A high coumestrol diet has also been shown to induce early development of the vulva and udder of female lambs. In addition to these anatomical abnormalities, exposure to coumestrol has also been shown to alter the estrus cycle of a number of animals, including cows and sheep, resulting in lower rates of fertility.

=== Skeletal system ===
Coumestrol has been shown to decrease bone resorption and promote the mineralization of bone in vitro and in vivo; daily injections of coumestrol were shown to reduce bone loss in rats who had undergone an ovariectomy.

=== Genotoxicity ===
Coumestrol has been shown to have clastogenic properties at a certain concentration.. Studies have shown that coumestrol is a mutagen and induces formation of micronuclei in hamster cells of the V79 cell line as well as human lymphoblastoid cells in a dose-dependent manner. Exposure to coumestrol also causes single stranded breaks in hamster DNA, compromising genome stability.

=== Metabolism ===
Studies have shown that coumestrol has beneficial properties on carbohydrate metabolism in ovariectomized rats, decreasing glycogen levels in skeletal muscle. There is also data indicating that coumestrol lowers plasma cholesterol levels in chicks. These results point to a possibility of coumestrol having a positive role to play against human obesity and diabetes in the future.

=== Menopause ===
Coumestrol and other phytoestrogens are sometimes used as a substitute for hormone therapy in the treatment of menopausal symptoms such as hot flashes and night sweats. However, studies have indicated that phytoestrogen-enriched foods and supplements are not necessarily effective against these symptoms. In addition, studies indicate that coumestrol and other phytoestrogens have an antiestrogenic effect in the brain and, as a result, do not produce the mental health benefits which are seen in estrogen replacement therapy.

=== Breast cancer ===
Coumestrol and other phytoestrogens have also been investigated as a possible substitute for hormone therapy and chemotherapy in breast cancer patients. The results of various studies regarding the use of phytoestrogens in treating breast cancer have been somewhat contradictory and ambiguous, and as a result, researchers cannot clearly define phytoestrogens like coumestrol as being chemoprotective agents or potentially having negative effects, such as inducing further growth of existing breast cancer tumors by activating ERα receptors. Researchers at Georgetown University Medical Center have investigated this matter and concluded that phytoestrogens may be used as an effective treatment for breast cancer because of their apoptotic properties, but that it is only safe to do so after menopause, when women have a much lower level of estrogen in their bodies, or when used conjunctively with anti-estrogen therapies.

== Current and future research ==
Most research on the biological effects of coumestrol has been conducted on animals because of ethical concerns. There is a need for more human studies to better understand potential human health impacts due to exposure. In addition, further research is required to fully understand the biosynthesis pathway of coumestrol, although it is believed to be similar to that of flavones and isoflavones. Further research is required to understand the exact nature of the relationship between the levels of coumestrol in a plant and the plant's response to pathogens.
