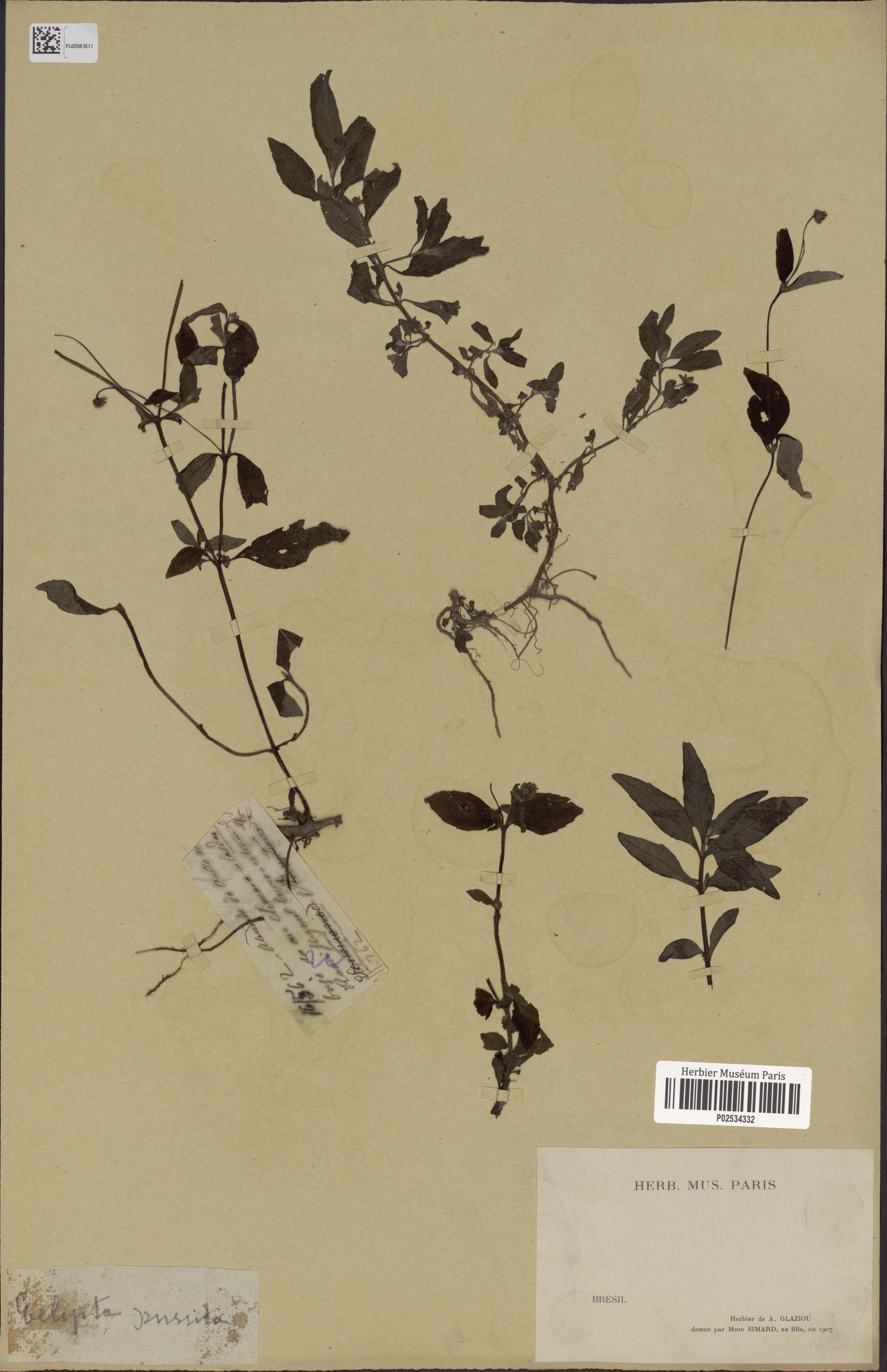

Scientific classification
- Kingdom: Plantae
- Clade: Tracheophytes
- Clade: Angiosperms
- Clade: Eudicots
- Clade: Asterids
- Order: Asterales
- Family: Asteraceae
- Tribe: Heliantheae
- Genus: Eclipta
- Species: E. pusilla

Binomial name
- Eclipta pusilla (Poir.) DC. 1836 not M.E. Jones 1933

Synonyms
- Verbesina pusilla Poir.

= Eclipta pusilla =

Species of flowering plant

Eclipta pusilla is a Caribbean species of plants in the family Asteraceae. It is native to the island of Puerto Rico in the West Indies, part of the United States.

== History of discovery ==
Eclipta pusilla was first described in 1808 by the French botanist Jean Louis Marie Poiret under the name Verbesina pusilla. This description appeared in volume 8 of Lamarck's Encyclopédie Méthodique: Botanique, where Poiret provided a Latin diagnosis and a French commentary. In 1836, the Swiss botanist Augustin Pyramus de Candolle reclassified the species into the genus Eclipta, resulting in the currently accepted name Eclipta pusilla.

In 1933, American botanist Marcus E. Jones described another plant under the same name, Eclipta pusilla, based on specimens he collected in Baja California Sur, Mexico, in 1930. However, this name is considered illegitimate due to its prior use by Poiret. The specimen collected by Jones is preserved as a holotype at the Rancho Santa Ana Botanic Garden.
