= Wedelolactone =

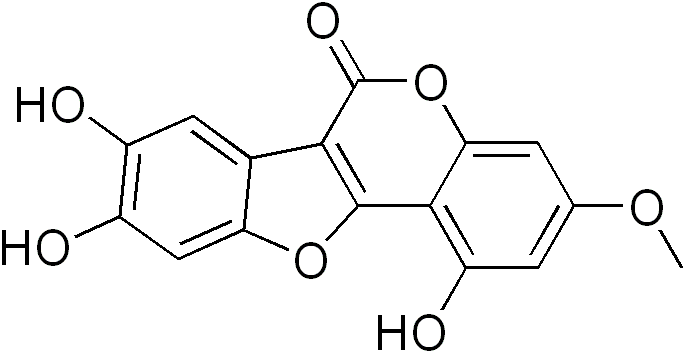

Names
- Preferred IUPAC name 1,8,9-Trihydroxy-3-methoxy-6H-[1]benzofuro[3,2-c][1]benzopyran-6-one

Identifiers
CAS Number	524-12-9
3D model (JSmol)	Interactive image
ChEBI	CHEBI:10037
ChEMBL	ChEMBL97453
ChemSpider	4445124
ECHA InfoCard	100.164.794
IUPHAR/BPS	5551
KEGG	C10541
PubChem CID	5281813
UNII	0K6L725GNS
CompTox Dashboard (EPA)	DTXSID60200408
- InChI: InChI=1S/C16H10O7/c1-21-6-2-10(19)14-12(3-6)23-16(20)13-7-4-8(17)9(18)5-11(7)22-15(13)14/h2-5,17-19H,1H3 Key: XQDCKJKKMFWXGB-UHFFFAOYSA-N
- SMILES: O=C3Oc4cc(OC)cc(O)c4c2oc1c(cc(O)c(O)c1)c23

Properties
Chemical formula	C_{16}H_{10}O_{7}
Molar mass	314.249 g·mol^{−1}
- Except where otherwise noted, data are given for materials in their standard state (at 25 °C [77 °F], 100 kPa). verify (what is ?) Infobox references

Wedelolactone is an organic chemical compound classified as a coumestan that occurs in Eclipta alba (false daisy) and in Wedelia calendulacea.
