= Plicadin =

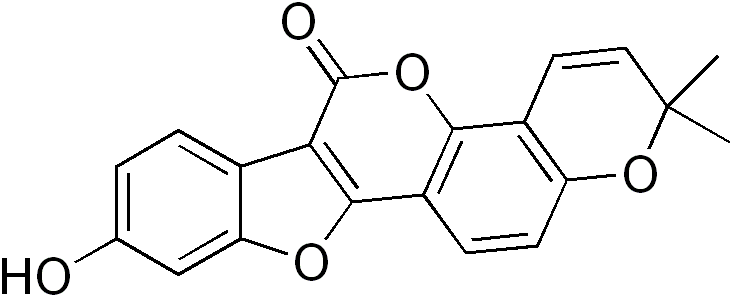

Names
- Preferred IUPAC name 9-Hydroxy-2,2-dimethyl-2H,6H-([1]benzofuro[2,3-d′]benzo[1,2-b:3,4-b′]dipyran)-6-one

Identifiers
CAS Number	137551-37-2
3D model (JSmol)	Interactive image
ChemSpider	9155739
PubChem CID	10980538
UNII	BH5TRC6URK
CompTox Dashboard (EPA)	DTXSID501029563
- InChI: InChI=1S/C20H14O5/c1-20(2)8-7-12-14(25-20)6-5-13-17(12)24-19(22)16-11-4-3-10(21)9-15(11)23-18(13)16/h3-9,21H,1-2H3 Key: SPBFWPDNBGDCCJ-UHFFFAOYSA-N; InChI=1/C20H14O5/c1-20(2)8-7-12-14(25-20)6-5-13-17(12)24-19(22)16-11-4-3-10(21)9-15(11)23-18(13)16/h3-9,21H,1-2H3 Key: SPBFWPDNBGDCCJ-UHFFFAOYAA
- SMILES: Oc4cc5oc2c(C(=O)Oc1c3C=CC(C)(C)Oc3ccc12)c5cc4

Properties
Chemical formula	C_{20}H_{14}O_{5}
Molar mass	334.32 g/mol
- Except where otherwise noted, data are given for materials in their standard state (at 25 °C [77 °F], 100 kPa). verify (what is ?) Infobox references

Plicadin is a coumestan found in the herb Psoralea plicata.
