= Coumestan =

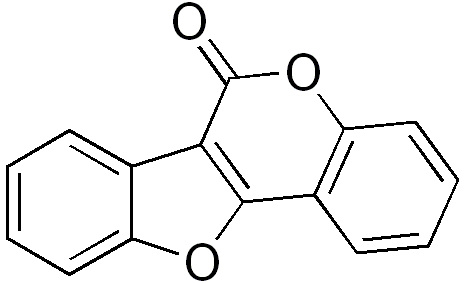

Names
- IUPAC name Pterocarp-6a(11a)-en-6-one
- Systematic IUPAC name 6H-[1]Benzofuro[3,2-c][1]benzopyran-6-one

Identifiers
CAS Number	479-12-9
3D model (JSmol)	Interactive image; Interactive image
ChEBI	CHEBI:72578
ChemSpider	553855
PubChem CID	638309
UNII	MT103Z562V
CompTox Dashboard (EPA)	DTXSID30197316
- InChI: InChI=1S/C15H8O3/c16-15-13-9-5-1-3-7-11(9)17-14(13)10-6-2-4-8-12(10)18-15/h1-8H Key: JBIZUYWOIKFETJ-UHFFFAOYSA-N; InChI=1/C15H8O3/c16-15-13-9-5-1-3-7-11(9)17-14(13)10-6-2-4-8-12(10)18-15/h1-8H Key: JBIZUYWOIKFETJ-UHFFFAOYAF
- SMILES: C1=CC=C2C(=C1)C3=C(O2)C4=CC=CC=C4OC3=O; O=C3Oc4ccccc4c2oc1c(cccc1)c23

Properties
Chemical formula	C_{15}H_{8}O_{3}
Molar mass	236.22 g/mol
Melting point	187 to 188 °C (369 to 370 °F; 460 to 461 K)
- Except where otherwise noted, data are given for materials in their standard state (at 25 °C [77 °F], 100 kPa). verify (what is ?) Infobox references

Coumestan is a heterocyclic organic compound. Coumestan forms the central core of a variety of natural compounds known collectively as coumestans. Coumestans are oxidation products of pterocarpan that are similar to coumarin. Coumestans, including coumestrol, a phytoestrogen, are found in a variety of plants. Food sources high in coumestans include split peas, pinto beans, lima beans, and especially alfalfa and clover sprouts.

Coumestrol has a similar binding affinity for the ER-β estrogen receptor as 17β-estradiol, but much less affinity than 17α-estradiol, although the estrogenic potency of coumestrol at both receptors is much less than that of 17β-estradiol.

Because of the estrogenic activity of some coumestans, a variety of syntheses have been developed that allow the preparation of coumestans so that their pharmacological effects can be explored.

== Coumestans ==
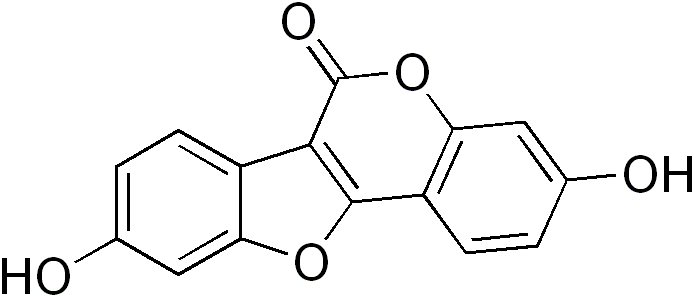
Coumestrol

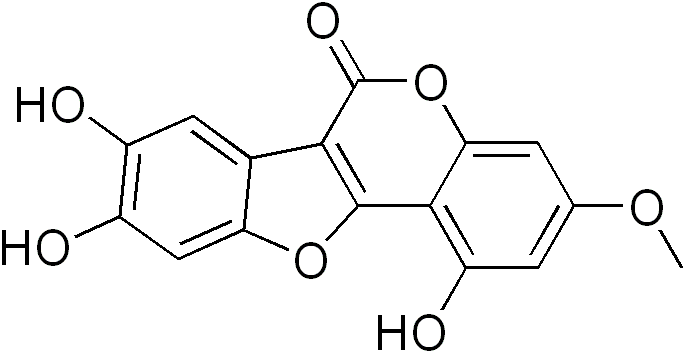
Wedelolactone

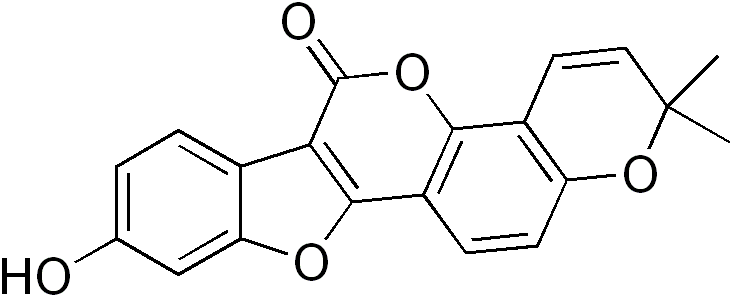
Plicadin
