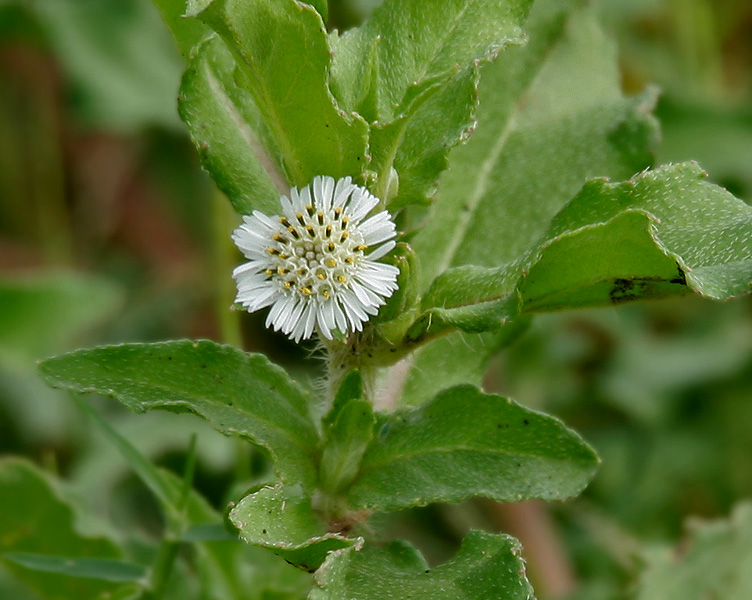
- Eclipta prostrata

Scientific classification
- Kingdom: Plantae
- Clade: Tracheophytes
- Clade: Angiosperms
- Clade: Eudicots
- Clade: Asterids
- Order: Asterales
- Family: Asteraceae
- Subfamily: Asteroideae
- Tribe: Heliantheae
- Subtribe: Ecliptinae
- Genus: Eclipta; L.

Type species
- Eclipta erecta L. (syn of E. prostrata)

Synonyms
- Eclypta E.Mey.; Eupatoriophalacron Adans; Clipteria Raf.; Abasoloa La Llave & Lex.; Ecliptica Rumph. ex Kuntze; Abasoloa La Llave; Paleista Raf.; Micrelium Forssk.

= Eclipta (plant) =

Genus of flowering plants

Eclipta is a genus of flowering plants in the family Asteraceae.

Species

- Eclipta alatocarpa - Queensland, Northern Territory, South Australia
- Eclipta angustata - apparently native to Nepal and Bengal; widely naturalized in China, Ryukyu Islands, Southeast Asia, northern India
- Eclipta elliptica - southern Brazil, Uruguay, northeastern Argentina
- Eclipta leiocarpa - Colombia
- Eclipta megapotamica - southern Brazil, Uruguay, northeastern Argentina
- Eclipta paludicola - southern Brazil
- Eclipta platyglossa - Australia
- Eclipta prostrata - Japan, China, Nepal, Australia, North and South America; naturalized in Europe, Africa, Pacific Islands (inc. Artemisia viridis Blanco = contra Artemisia viridis Willd. ex DC.).
- Eclipta pusilla - Puerto Rico
