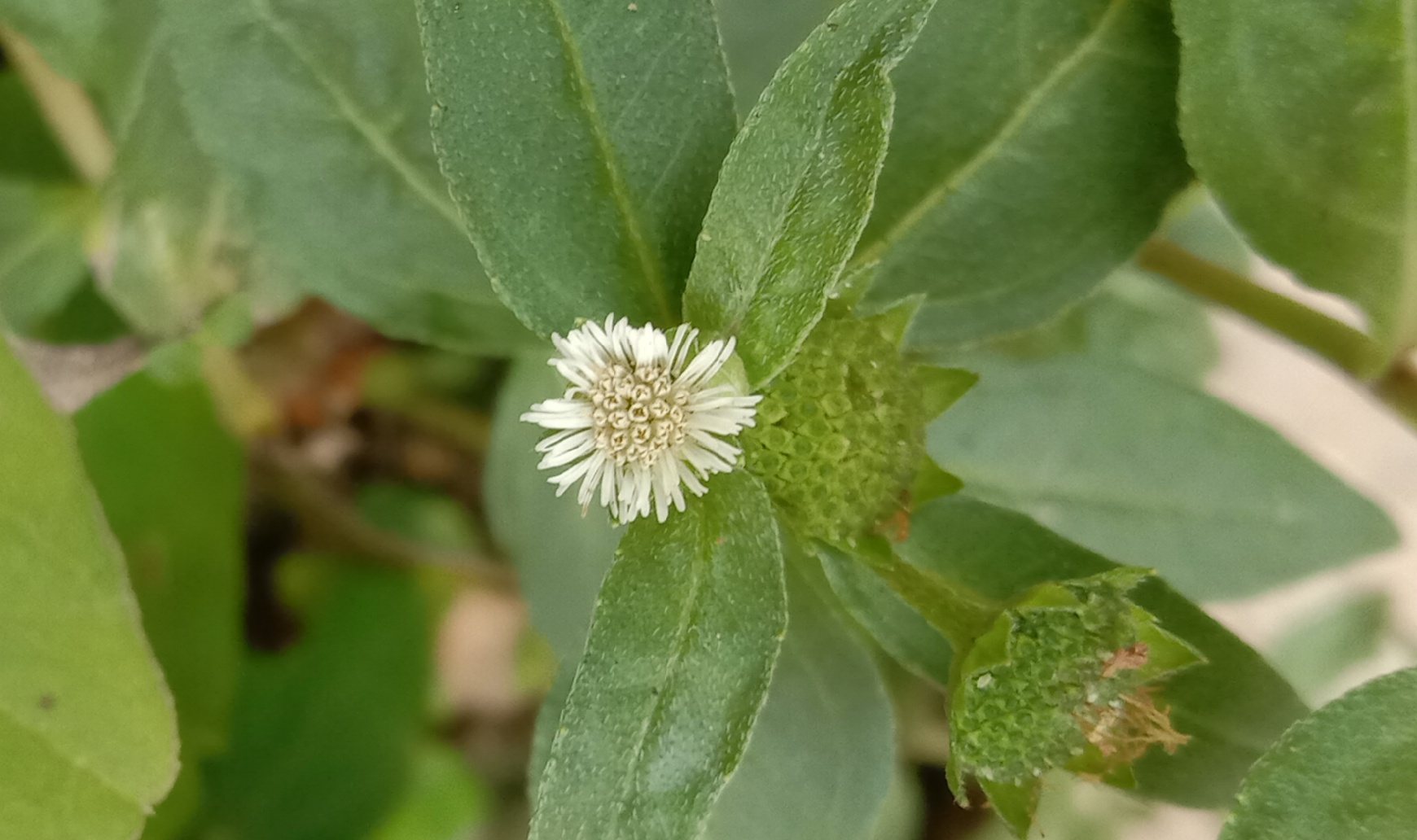

Conservation status
- Least Concern (IUCN 3.1)

Scientific classification
- Kingdom: Plantae
- Clade: Embryophytes
- Clade: Tracheophytes
- Clade: Angiosperms
- Clade: Eudicots
- Clade: Asterids
- Order: Asterales
- Family: Asteraceae
- Tribe: Heliantheae
- Genus: Eclipta
- Species: E. prostrata

Binomial name
- Eclipta prostrata (L.) L.

Synonyms
- Synonymy: Verbesina prostrata L.; Eclipta undulata Willd.; Eclipta patula Schrad. ex DC.; Micrelium tolak Forssk.; Cotula oederi Murray; Eclipta longifolia Schrad. ex DC.; Eclipta dichotoma Raf.; Eclipta zippeliana Blume; Spilanthes pseudo-acmella (L.) Murray; Eclipta philippinensis Gand.; Eclipta ciliata Raf.; Eclipta heterophylla Bartl.; Cotula prostrata (L.) L.; Verbesina pseudoacmella L.; Eclipta brachypoda Michx.; Galinsoga oblonga DC.; Verbesina conyzoides Trew; Amellus carolinianus Walter; Anthemis viridis Blanco; Anthemis cotula-foetida Crantz; Eupatoriophalacron album (L.) Hitchc.; Eclipta oederi (Murray) Weigel; Eclipta linearis Otto ex Sweet; Buphthalmum diffusum Vahl ex DC.; Eclipta punctata L.; Bellis ramosa Jacq.; Eclipta simplex Raf.; Eclipta procumbens Michx.; Eclipta tinctoria Raf.; Verbesina alba L.; Eleutheranthera prostrata (L.) Sch.Bip.; Eclipta palustris DC.; Acmella lanceolata Link ex Spreng.; Eclipta strumosa Salisb.; Eclipta nutans Raf.; Eclipta dubia Raf.; Eclipta sulcata Raf.; Eclipta dentata B.Heyne ex Wall.; Eclipta marginata Boiss.; Eclipta spicata Spreng.; Chamaemelum foetidum Baumg.; Eclipta patula Schrad.; Eclipta alba (L.) Hassk.; Cotula alba (L.) L.; Wilborgia oblongifolia Hook.; Anthemis cotuloides Raf. ex DC.; Ecliptica alba (L.) Kuntze; Eclipta arabica Steud.; Grangea lanceolata Poir.; Galinsoga oblongifolia (Hook.) DC.; Eclipta adpressa Moench; Eclipta erecta L.; Wedelia psammophila Poepp.; Chamaemelum foetidum Garsault; Eclipta flexuosa Raf.; Bellis racemosa Steud.; Anthemis sulphurea Wall. ex Nyman; Eclipta thermalis Bunge; Eclipta marginata Steud.; Polygyne inconspicua Phil.; Eclipta parviflora Wall. ex DC.; Eclipta angustifolia C.Presl; Paleista brachypoda (Michx.) Raf.; Eclipta longifolia Schrad.; Anthemis cotula Blanco; Anthemis abyssinica J.Gay ex A.Rich.; Eclipta hirsuta Bartl.

= Eclipta prostrata =

Species of flowering plant

Eclipta prostrata, the false daisy or tattoo plant, is a species of plant in the family Asteraceae. It is widespread across much of the world.

This species is native to North and South America. It also grows commonly in moist places in warm temperate to tropical areas worldwide. It can be found in habitats such as on marsh edges, along lake shores and river banks, and in brackish marshes and cypress depression swamps. It is considered to be a weed.

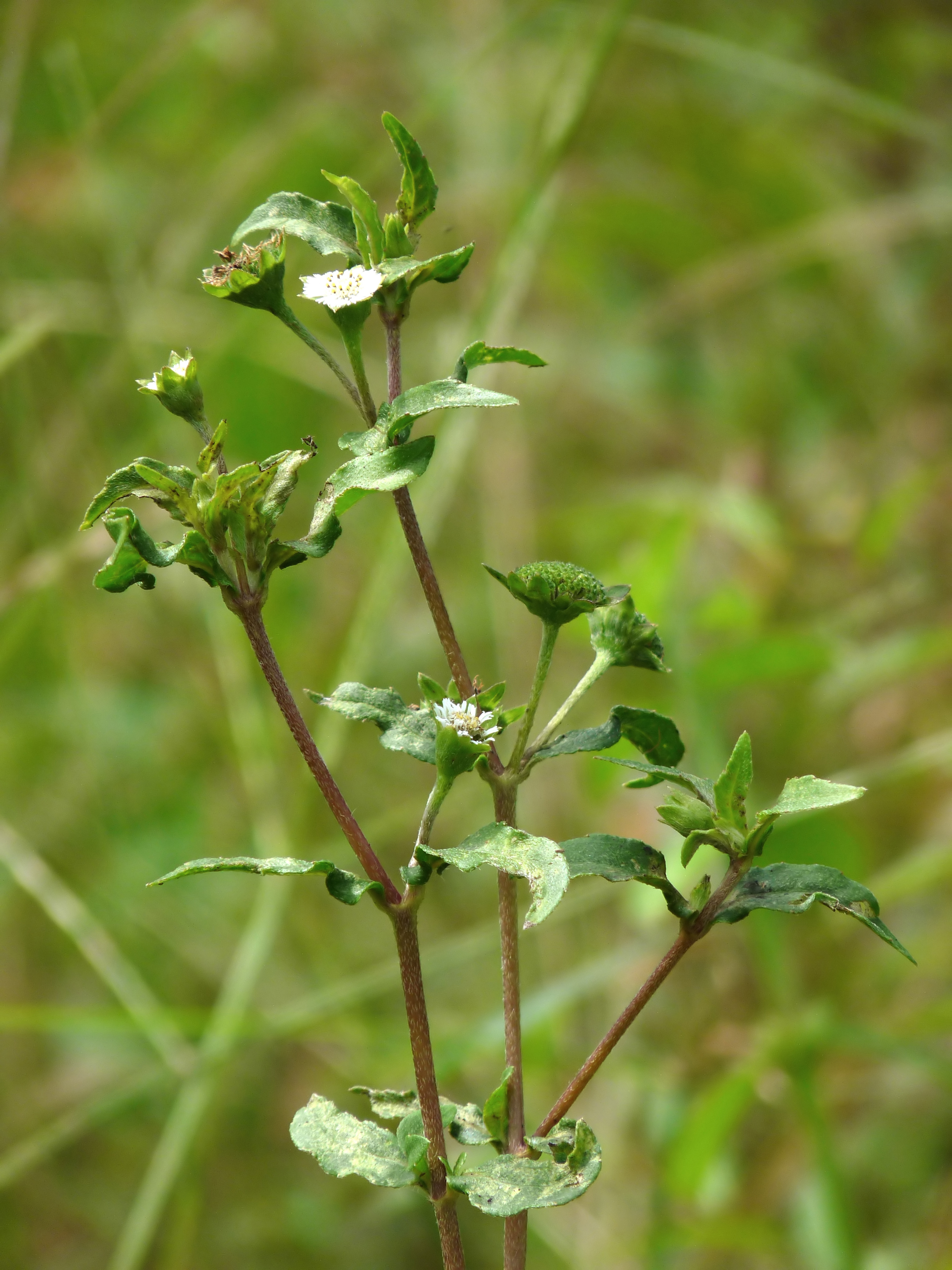
E. prostrata, India

== Description ==
This plant has fibrous cylindrical, grayish roots from a shallow taproot. Solid, circular, purplish stems with white fine hairs, and grows between 0.3 and 1.5 m in height. Leaves arranged in opposite pairs, hairy in two-sided, lanceolate, serrated 2–12.5 cm long, 5–35 mm wide. The solitary perfect flower heads are 6–8 mm (0.24–0.31 in) in diameter, with white florets. The bumpy achenes are compressed and narrowly winged with the papus attached at the apex, as well as an inconspicuous tuft of small trichomes.

== Traditional uses ==
The plant has traditional uses in Ayurveda. In Hindi speaking regions of India, it is known as bhangra or bhringaraj. Wedelia calendulacea is known by the same names, so the white-flowered E. alba is called white bhangra and the yellow-flowered W. calendulacea is called yellow bhangra.

In Southeast Asia, the dried whole plant is used in traditional medicine, although there is no high-quality clinical research to indicate such uses are effective. The Balinese cook it as a vegetable, the Javanese consume this herb (orang-aring or urang-aring) as part of their lalap, they also infuse it with coconut oil as a kind of hair oil popular until the 1970s Its leaves are extracted as a black hair dye, and in tattooing.

== Phytochemistry ==
Eclipta prostrata contains various phytochemicals, such as coumestans, polypeptides, polyacetylenes, thiophene derivatives, steroids, sterols, triterpenes, and flavonoids.

== Gallery ==
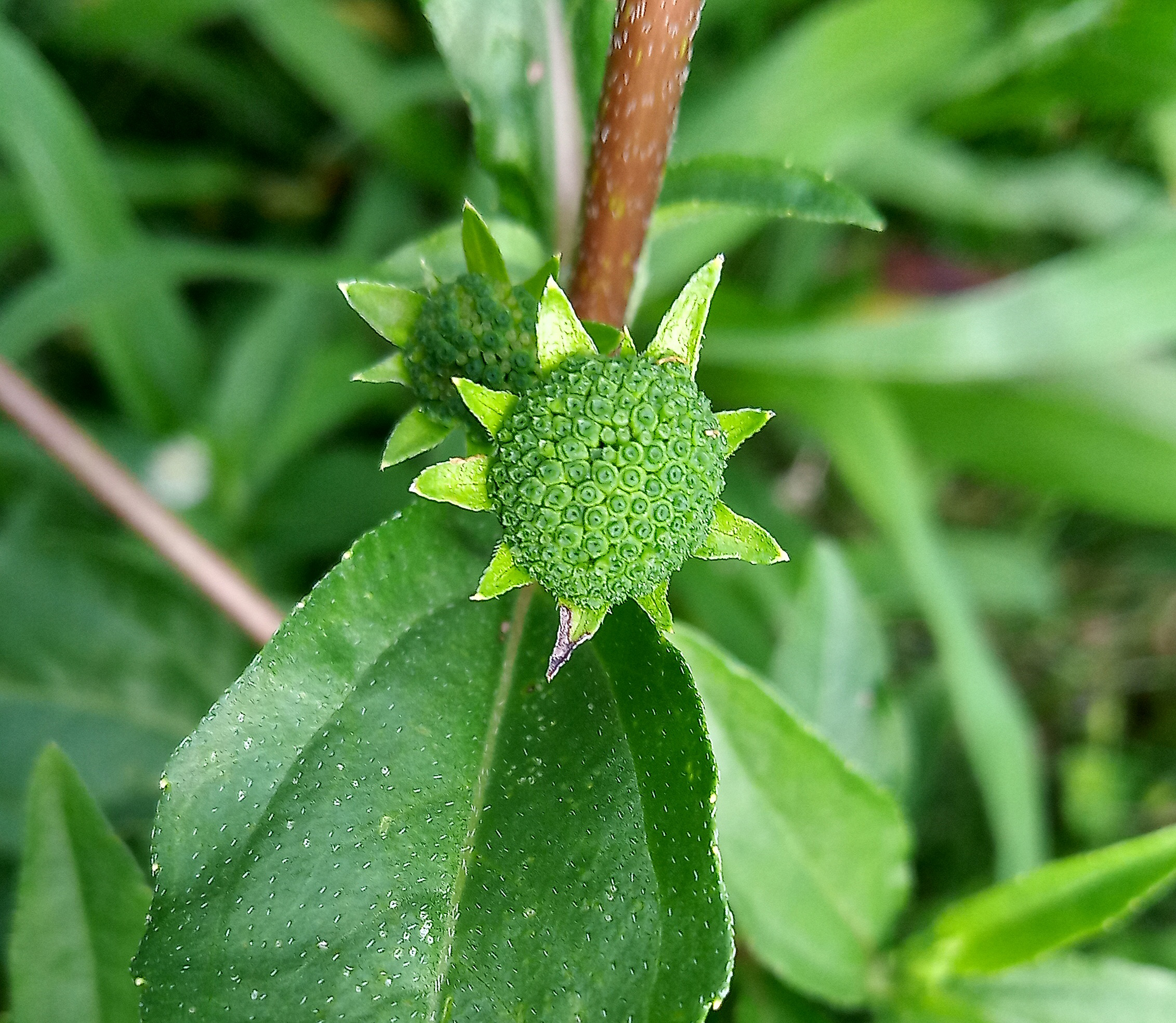
Flower bud

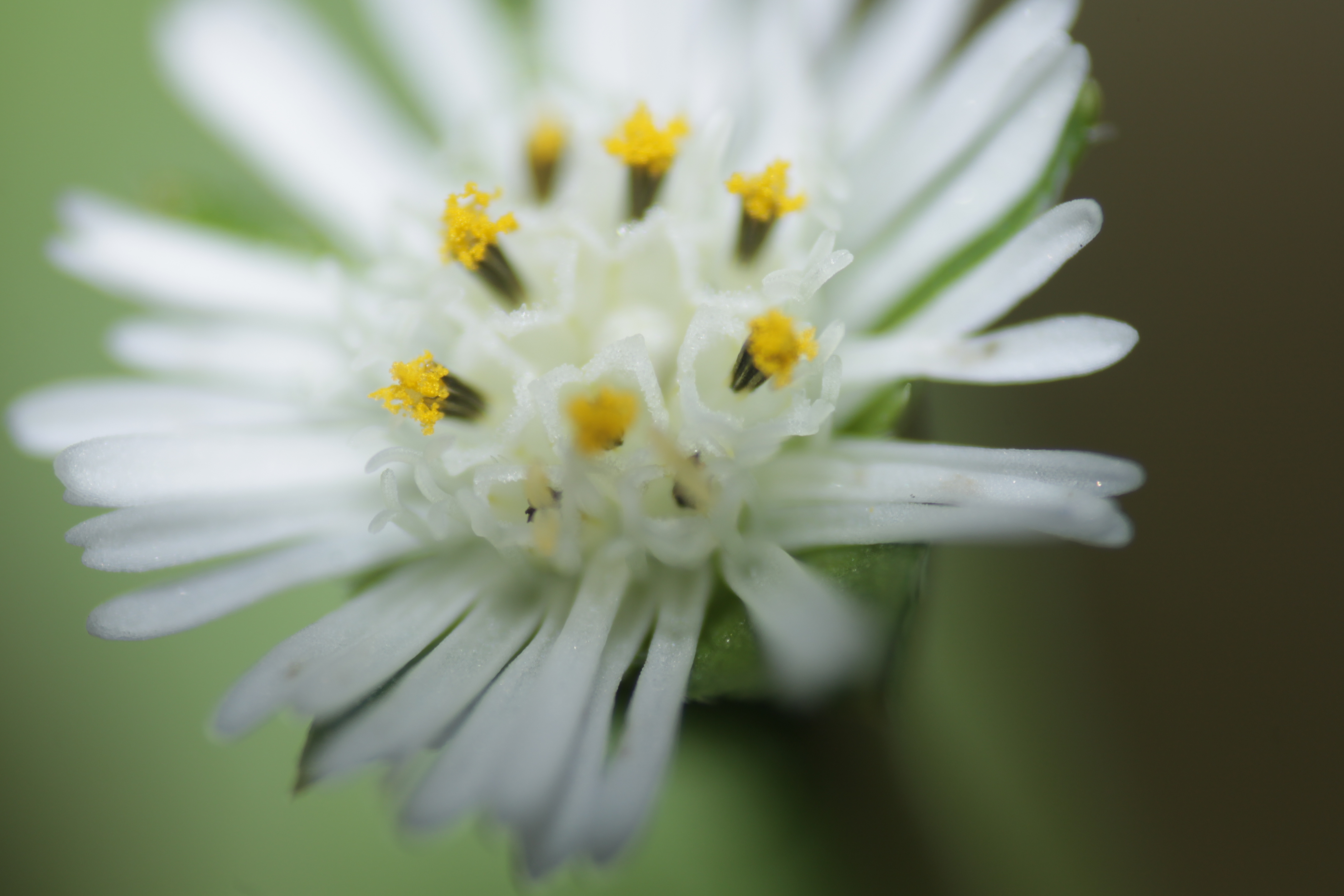
Flower

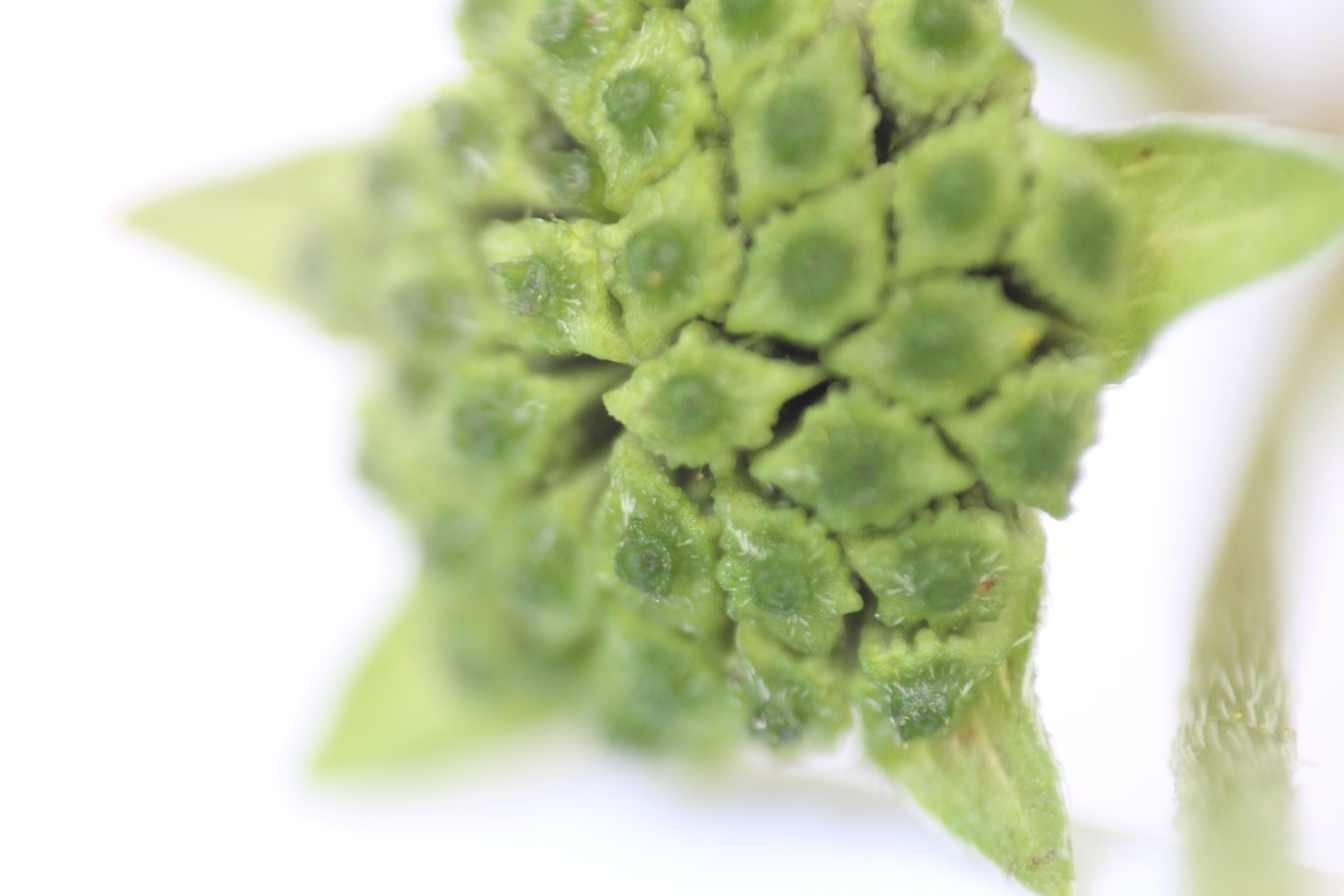
Seeds, closeup
