= Plicatin A =

- Chemical structure of plicatin A

Names
- Preferred IUPAC name Methyl (2E)-3-{4-hydroxy-3-[(2R)-2-hydroxy-3-methylbut-3-en-1-yl]phenyl}prop-2-enoate

Identifiers
CAS Number	131889-82-2
3D model (JSmol)	Interactive image
ChemSpider	103882127
PubChem CID	15730631
CompTox Dashboard (EPA)	DTXSID101127557
- InChI: InChI=1S/C15H18O4/c1-10(2)14(17)9-12-8-11(4-6-13(12)16)5-7-15(18)19-3/h4-8,14,16-17H,1,9H2,2-3H3/b7-5+/t14-/m1/s1 Key: ROCPNNHDHKREAV-HZRUHFOJSA-N
- SMILES: CC(=C)[C@@H](CC1=C(C=CC(=C1)/C=C/C(=O)OC)O)O

Properties
Chemical formula	C_{15}H_{18}O_{4}
Molar mass	262.305 g·mol^{−1}
- Except where otherwise noted, data are given for materials in their standard state (at 25 °C [77 °F], 100 kPa). verify (what is ?) Infobox references

Plicatin A is a hydroxycinnamic acid found in Psoralea plicata.
