= Wedelia calendulacea =

Wedelia calendulacea may refer to:

- Wedelia calendulacea (L.) Less., an illegitimate name that is a synonym of Sphagneticola calendulacea
- Wedelia calendulacea Rich, an unresolved name in the genus Wedelia
