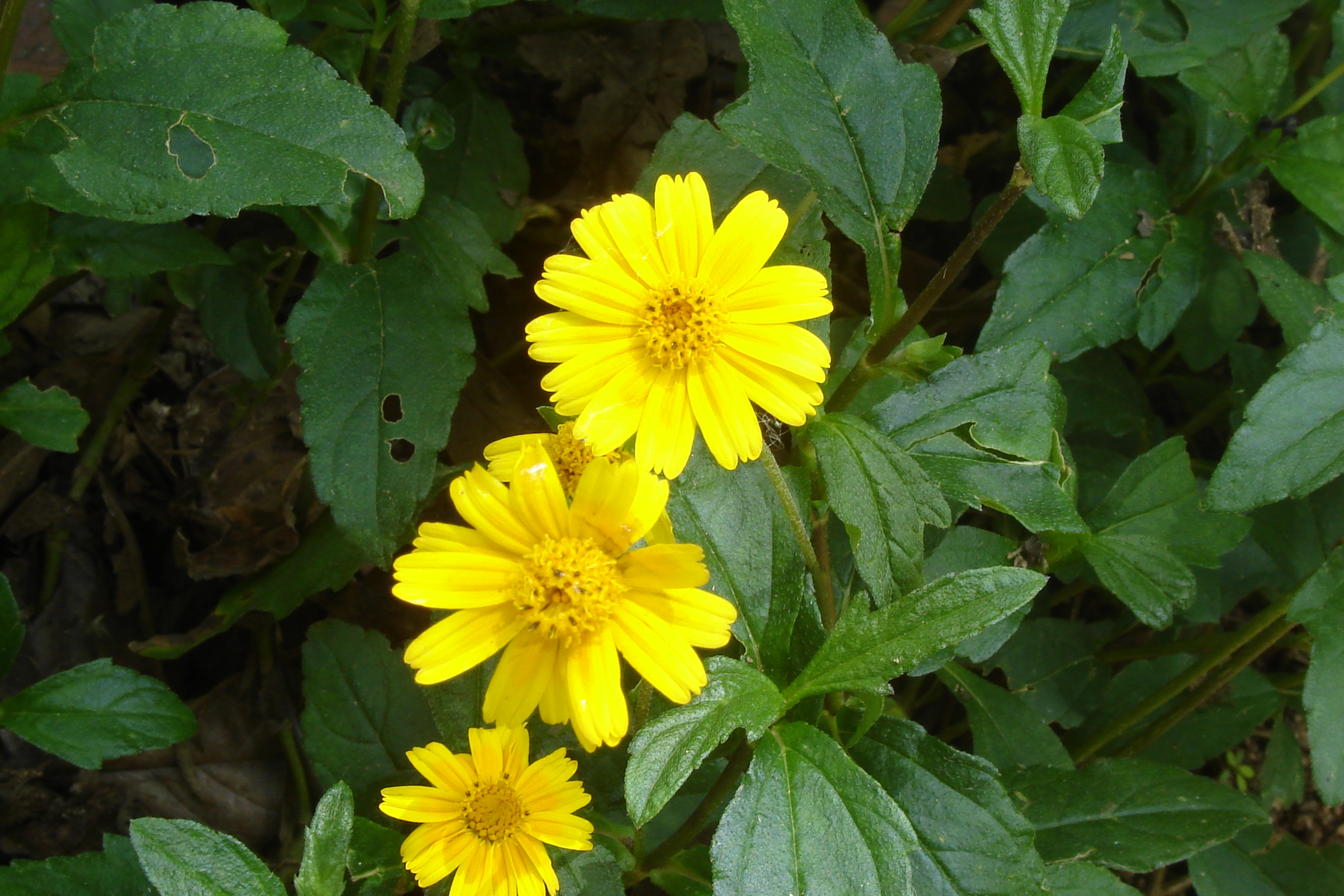

Scientific classification
- Kingdom: Plantae
- Clade: Tracheophytes
- Clade: Angiosperms
- Clade: Eudicots
- Clade: Asterids
- Order: Asterales
- Family: Asteraceae
- Tribe: Heliantheae
- Genus: Sphagneticola
- Species: S. trilobata

Binomial name
- Sphagneticola trilobata (L.) Pruski

Synonyms
- Complaya trilobata (L.) Strother; Silphium trilobatum L. Thelechitonia trilobata (L.) H.Rob. & Cuatrec. Wedelia carnosa Rich. Wedelia paludosa DC. Wedelia trilobata (L.) Hitchc.

= Sphagneticola trilobata =

Species of plant

Sphagneticola trilobata, commonly known as the Bay Biscayne creeping-oxeye, marigold Singapore daisy, creeping-oxeye, trailing daisy, and wedelia, is a plant in the tribe Heliantheae of the family Asteraceae. It is native to Mexico, Central America, and the Caribbean, but now grows throughout the Neotropics. It is widely cultivated as an ornamental groundcover.

== Description ==
Spreading, mat-forming perennial herb up to 30 cm in height. Has rounded stems up to 40 cm long, rooting at nodes and with the flowering stems ascending. Leaves are fleshy, hairy, 4–9 cm long and 2–5 cm wide, serrate or irregularly toothed, normally with pairs of lateral lobes, and dark green above and lighter green below. Its surface is hairy or glabrous, rarely scaly.

=== Inflorescence ===
Peduncles are 3–10 cm long; involucres are campanulate to hemispherical, about 1 cm high; chaffy bracts are lanceolate, rigid. The flowers are bright yellow ray florets of about 8-13 per head, rays are 6–15 mm long; disk-corollas 4–5 mm long. The pappus is a crown of short fimbriate scales. The seeds are tuberculate achenes, 4–5 mm long. Propagation is mostly vegetatively as seeds are usually not fertile. In the tropics it is free-flowering, and elsewhere it blooms mostly from spring to autumn.

== Habitat ==
It has a very wide ecological tolerance range, but grows best in sunny areas with well-drained, moist soil at low elevations.

== Invasive species ==
Sphagneticola trilobata is listed in the IUCN's “List of the world's 100 worst invasive species”. It is spread by people as an ornamental or groundcover that is planted in gardens, where it can escape to surrounding areas by dumping of garden waste. It spreads vegetatively, not by seed. It rapidly forms a dense ground cover, crowding away and preventing other plant species from regenerating. This species is widely available as an ornamental and is therefore likely to spread further.

It is a noxious weed in agricultural land, along roadsides urban waste places and other disturbed sites. It is also invasive along streams, canals, along the borders of mangrove swamps and in coastal vegetation.

It is widespread as an invasive species on the Pacific Islands, Hong Kong, South Africa, Australia, Indonesia, and Sri Lanka.

== Gallery ==
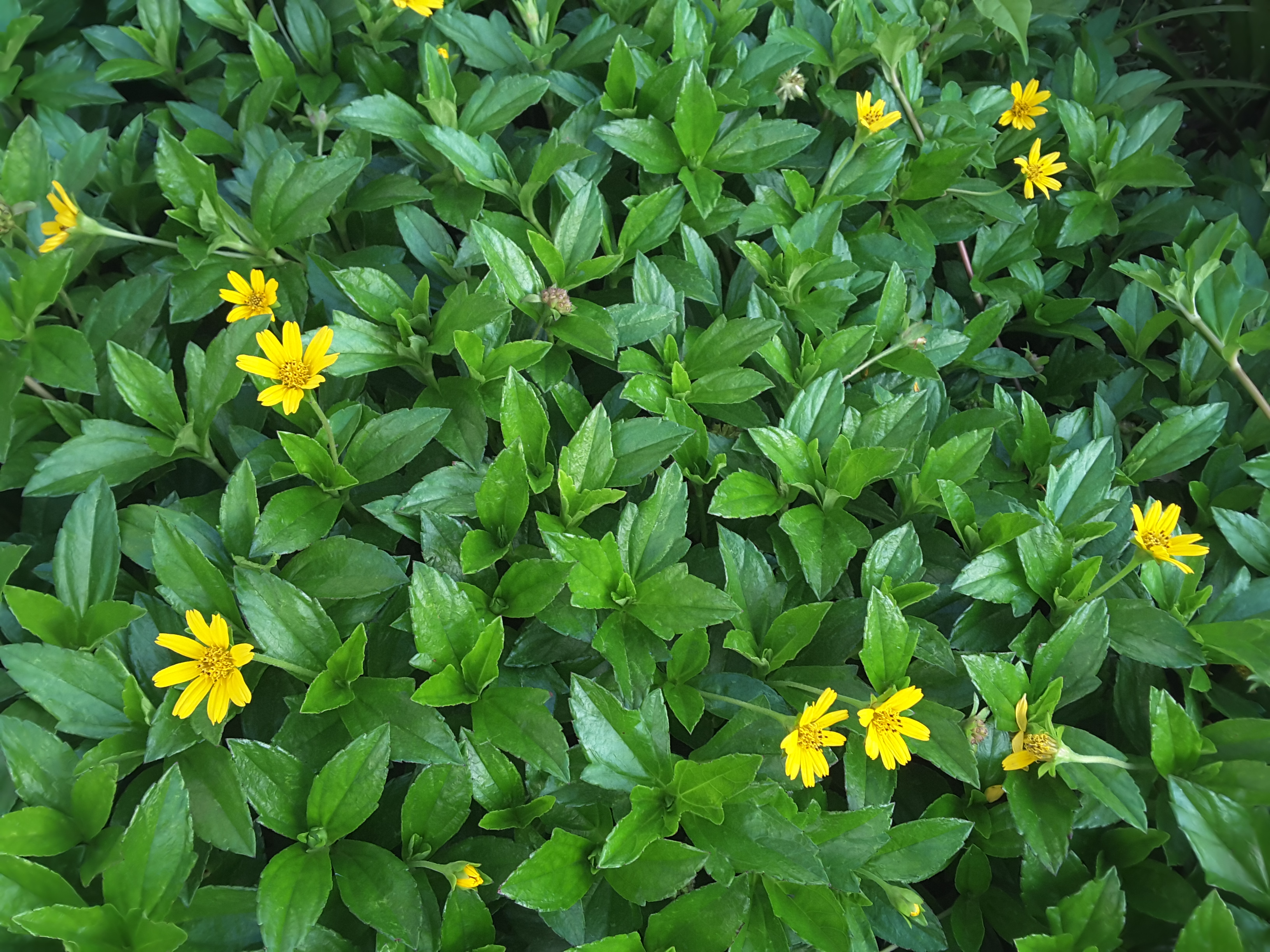
File:Sphagneticola_trilobata_in_Singapore.jpgSphagneticola trilobata in Singapore.

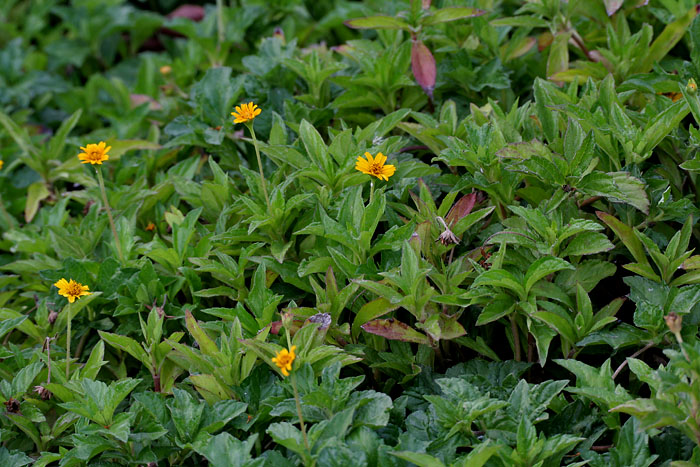
File:Creeping_Daisy_or_Yellow_dots_(Wedelia_trilobata)_at_Lotus_Pond,_Hyderabad,_AP_W_IMG_7641.jpgIn Hyderabad, India.

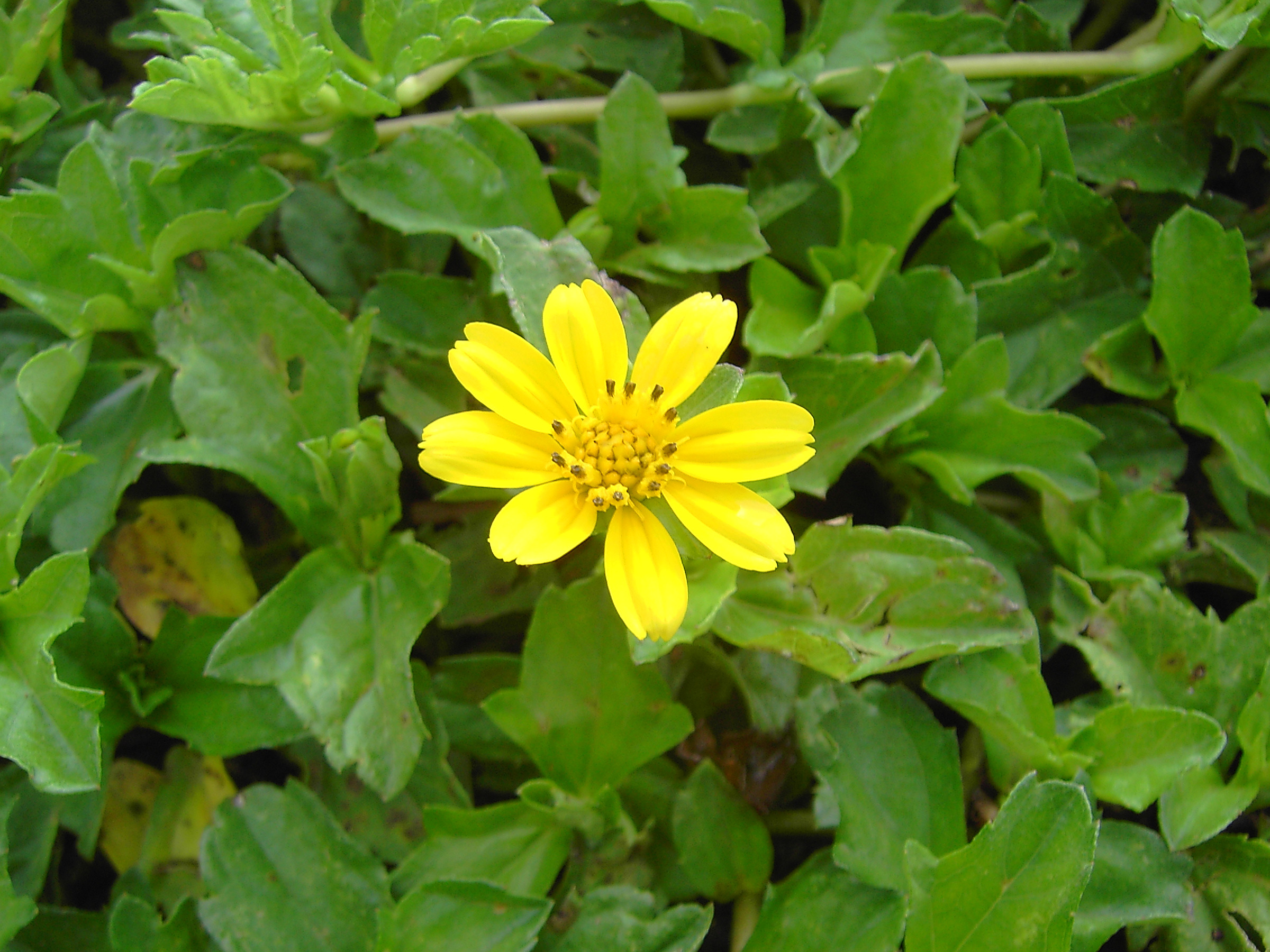
File:Wedelia_trilobata.jpgIn Dominica

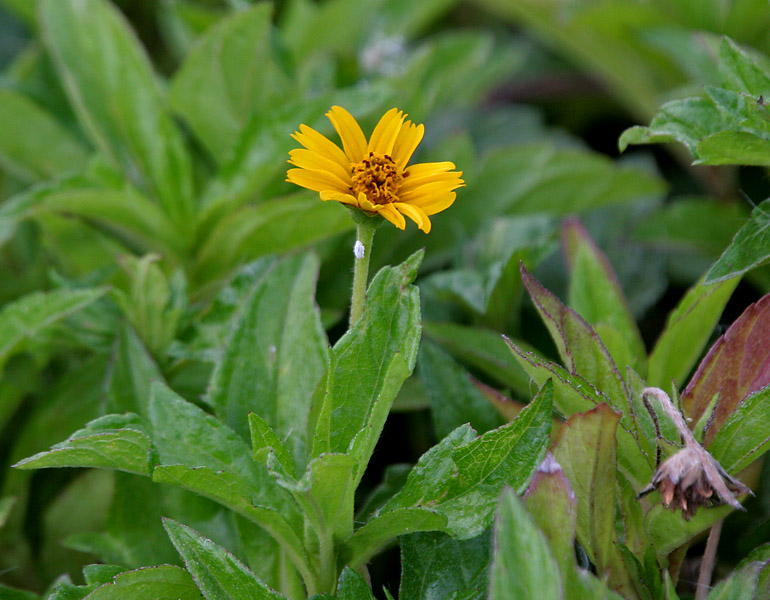
File:Creeping_Daisy_or_Yellow_dots_(Wedelia_trilobata)_at_Lotus_Pond,_Hyderabad,_AP_W_IMG_7640.jpgIn Hyderabad, India.

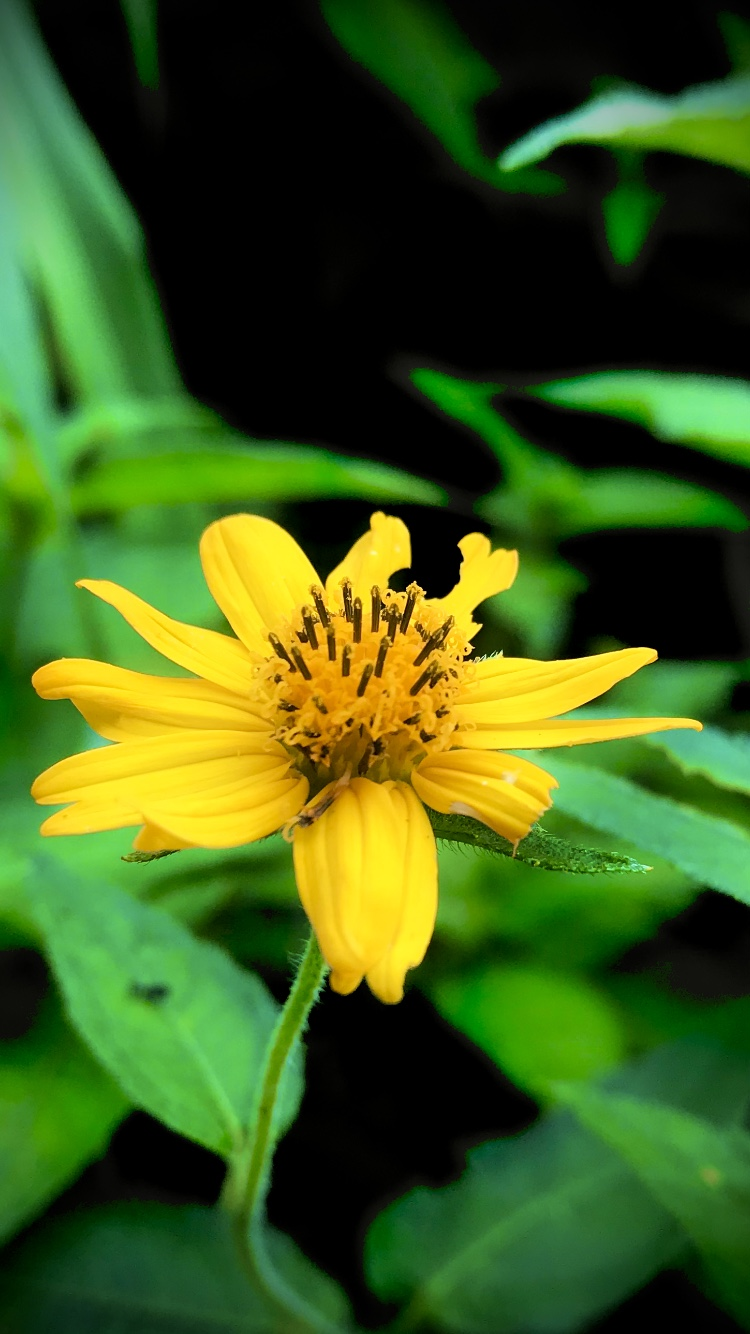
File:Sphagneticola_trilobata_in_Nigeria_2.jpgIn Nigeria

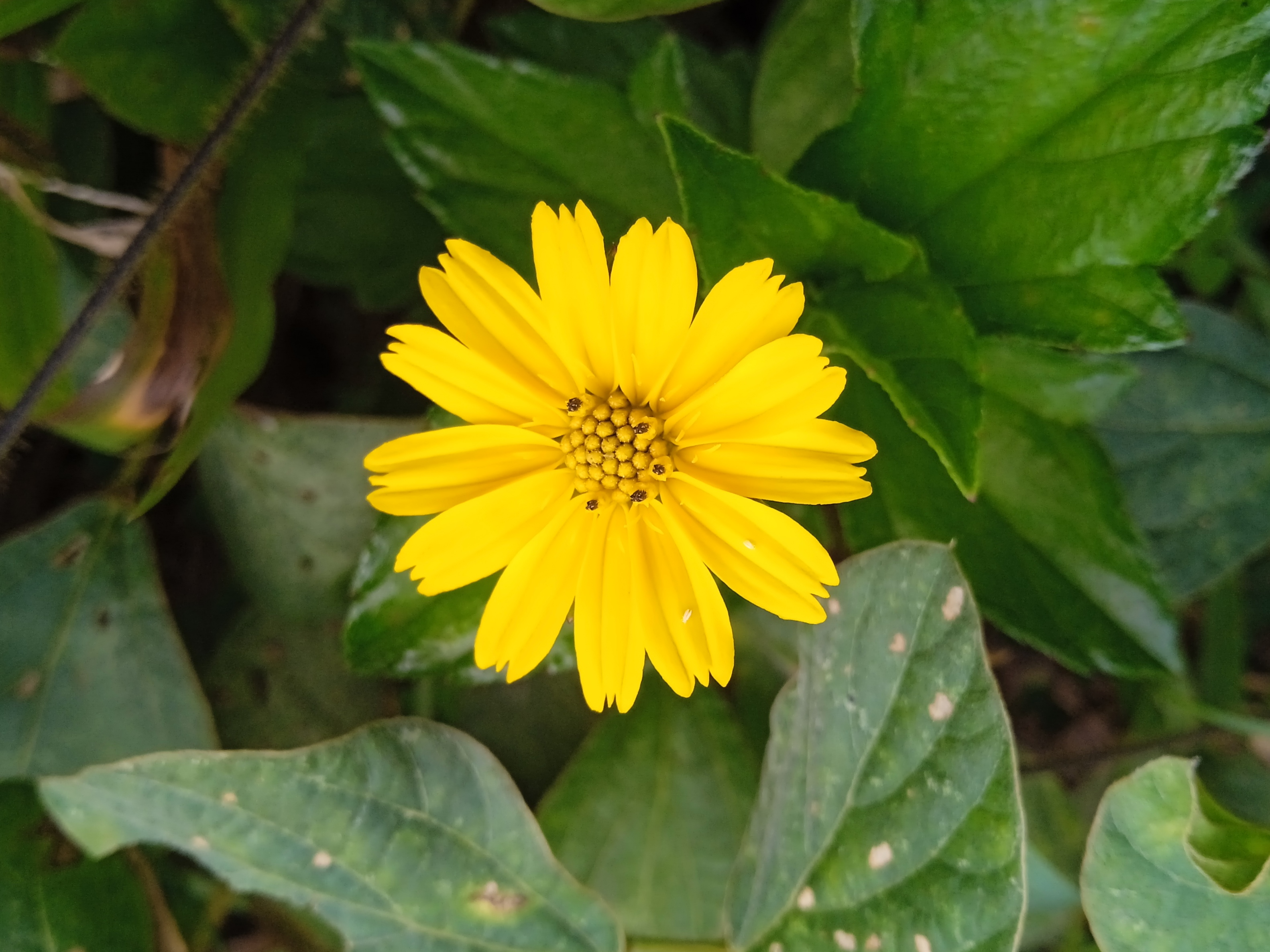
File:Sphagneticola_trilobata_at_Elmina_West_in_Seksyen_U15,_Shah_Alam_20231126_102624.jpgS. trilobata in Shah Alam, Malaysia
