= Plicatin B =

- Chemical structure of plicatin B

Names
- Preferred IUPAC name Methyl (2E)-3-[4-hydroxy-3-(3-methylbut-2-en-1-yl)phenyl]prop-2-enoate

Identifiers
CAS Number	72704-01-9 =
3D model (JSmol)	Interactive image
ChEMBL	ChEMBL451699
ChemSpider	4943161
PubChem CID	6438704
CompTox Dashboard (EPA)	DTXSID801029774
- InChI: InChI=1S/C15H18O3/c1-11(2)4-7-13-10-12(5-8-14(13)16)6-9-15(17)18-3/h4-6,8-10,16H,7H2,1-3H3/b9-6+ Key: LZEOAWXRNGQEHO-RMKNXTFCSA-N; InChI=1/C15H18O3/c1-11(2)4-7-13-10-12(5-8-14(13)16)6-9-15(17)18-3/h4-6,8-10,16H,7H2,1-3H3/b9-6+ Key: LZEOAWXRNGQEHO-RMKNXTFCBP
- SMILES: O=C(OC)\C=C\c1ccc(O)c(c1)C/C=C(\C)C

Properties
Chemical formula	C_{15}H_{18}O_{3}
Molar mass	246.30 g/mol
- Except where otherwise noted, data are given for materials in their standard state (at 25 °C [77 °F], 100 kPa). verify (what is ?) Infobox references

Plicatin B is a hydroxycinnamic acid found in Psoralea plicata.
